= Extremophile =

Organisms capable of living in extreme environments

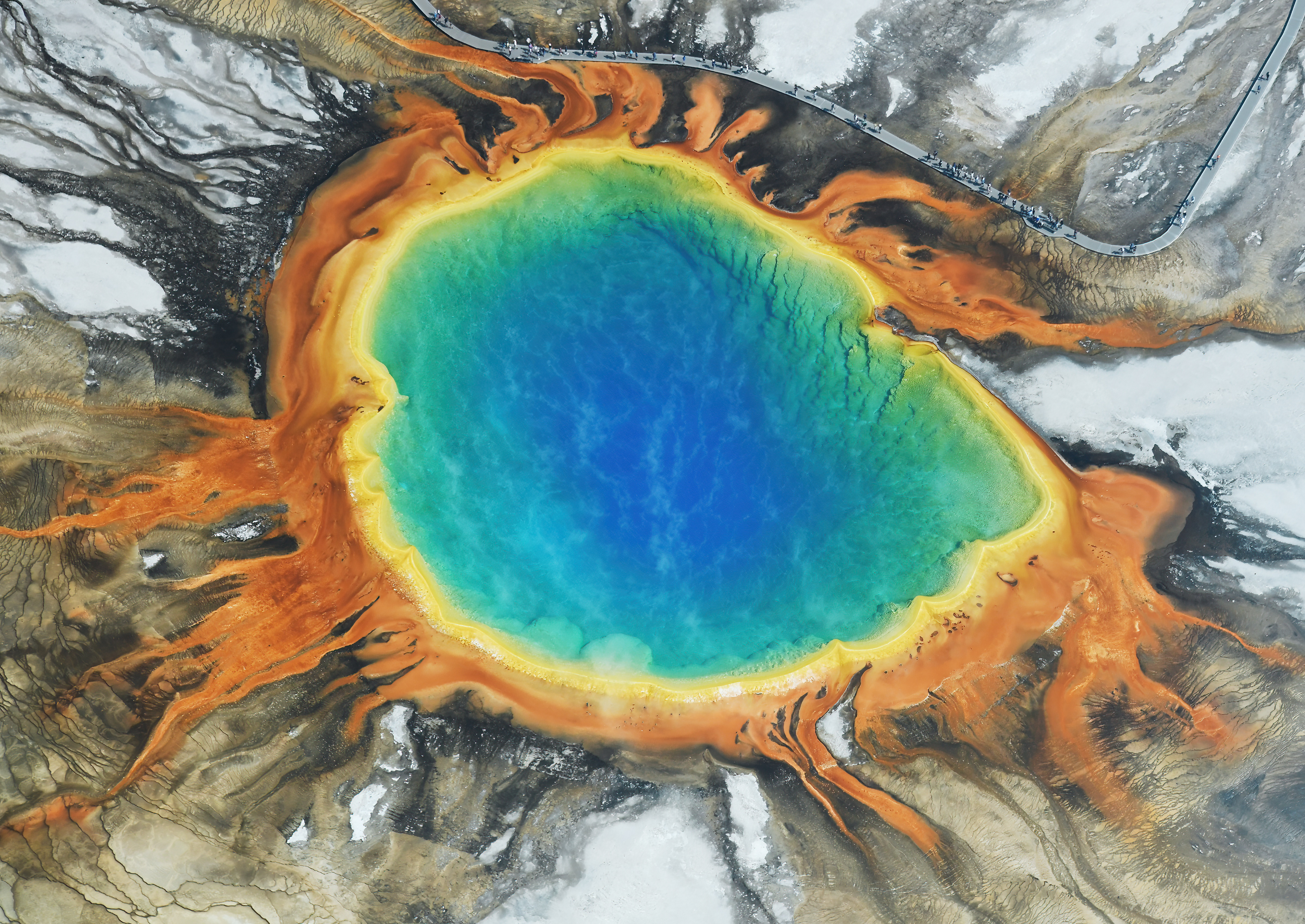
The bright colors of Grand Prismatic Spring in Yellowstone National Park are produced by thermophiles, a type of extremophile.

An extremophile (from Latin extremus 'extreme' and Ancient Greek φιλία (philía) 'love') is an organism that is able to live or even thrive in extreme environments, such as extreme temperature (hot or cold), pressure, radiation, salinity, or pH level. Extremophiles are mainly species of microorganisms – bacteria and chiefly archaea, but also include some eukaryotes such as some fungi, and tardigrades.

Since the definition of an extreme environment is relative to an arbitrarily defined standard, often an anthropocentric one, these organisms can be considered ecologically dominant in the evolutionary history of the planet. Extremophiles have continued to thrive in the most extreme conditions, making them one of the most abundant lifeforms. The study of extremophiles has expanded human knowledge of the limits of life, and informs speculation about extraterrestrial life. Extremophiles are also of interest because of their potential for bioremediation of environments made hazardous to humans due to pollution or contamination.

== Characteristics ==
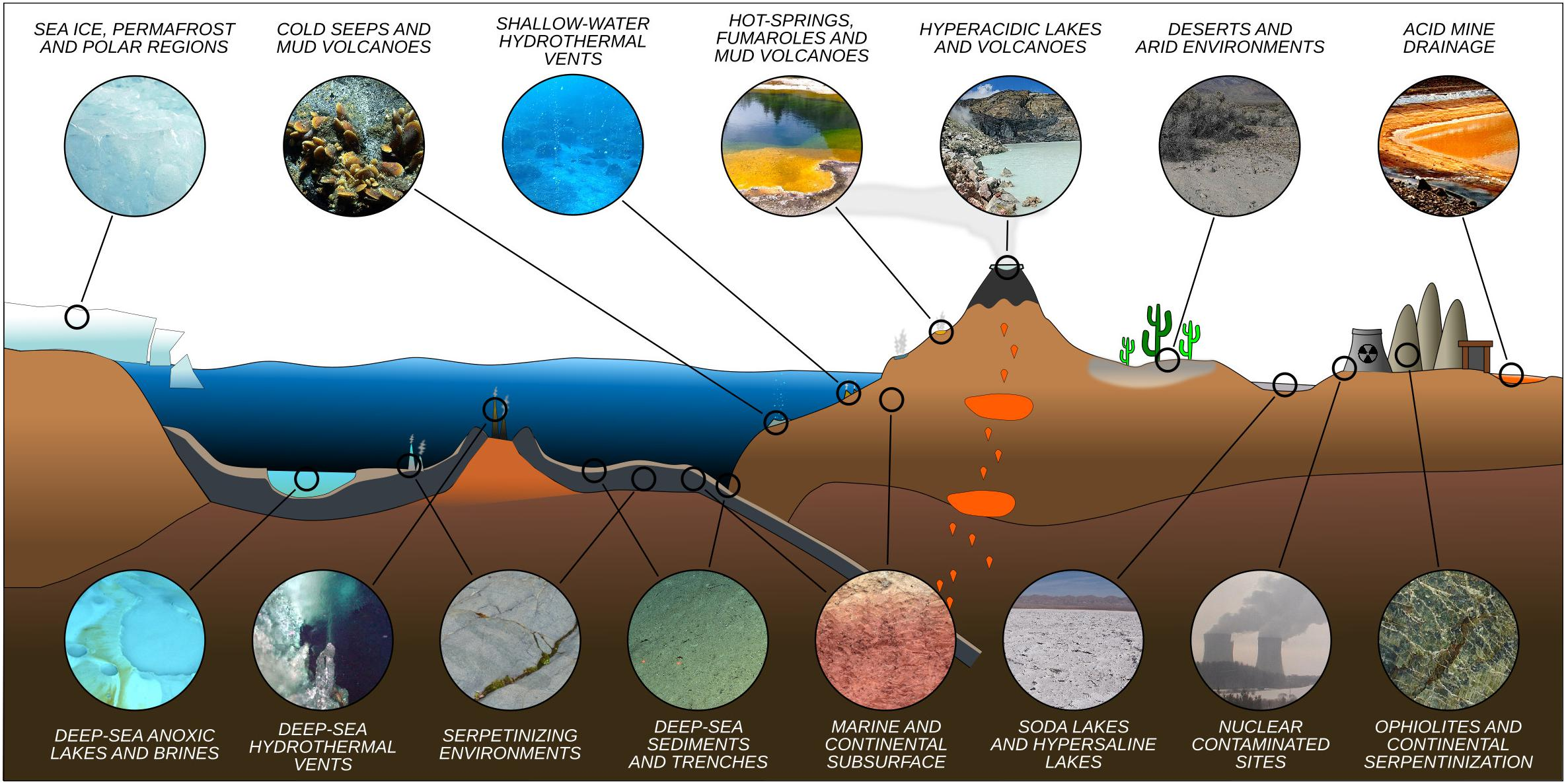
Diversity of extreme environments on Earth

In the 1980s and 1990s, biologists found that microbial life can survive in extreme environments—niches that are acidic, extraordinarily hot, or with irregular air pressure for example—that would be inhospitable to complex organisms. Some scientists even concluded that life may have begun on Earth in hydrothermal vents far beneath the ocean's surface.

According to astrophysicist Steinn Sigurdsson, "There are viable bacterial spores that have been found that are 40 million years old on Earth—and we know they're very hardened to radiation." Some bacteria were found living in the cold and dark in a lake buried a half-mile deep under the ice in Antarctica, and in the Mariana Trench, the deepest place in Earth's oceans. Expeditions of the International Ocean Discovery Program found microorganisms in 120 °C (248 °F) sediment that is 1.2 km (0.75 mi) below seafloor in the Nankai Trough subduction zone. Some microorganisms have been found thriving inside rocks up to 1,900 feet (580 m) below the sea floor under 8,500 feet (2,600 m) of ocean off the coast of the northwestern United States. According to one of the researchers, "You can find microbes everywhere—they're extremely adaptable to conditions, and survive wherever they are." A key to extremophile adaptation is their amino acid composition, affecting their protein folding ability under particular conditions. Studying extreme environments on Earth can help researchers understand the limits of habitability on other worlds.

Tom Gheysens from Ghent University in Belgium and colleagues showed that endospores from a species of Bacillus bacteria were viable after being heated to temperatures of 420 °C (788 °F).

== Classification ==
=== Definitions ===
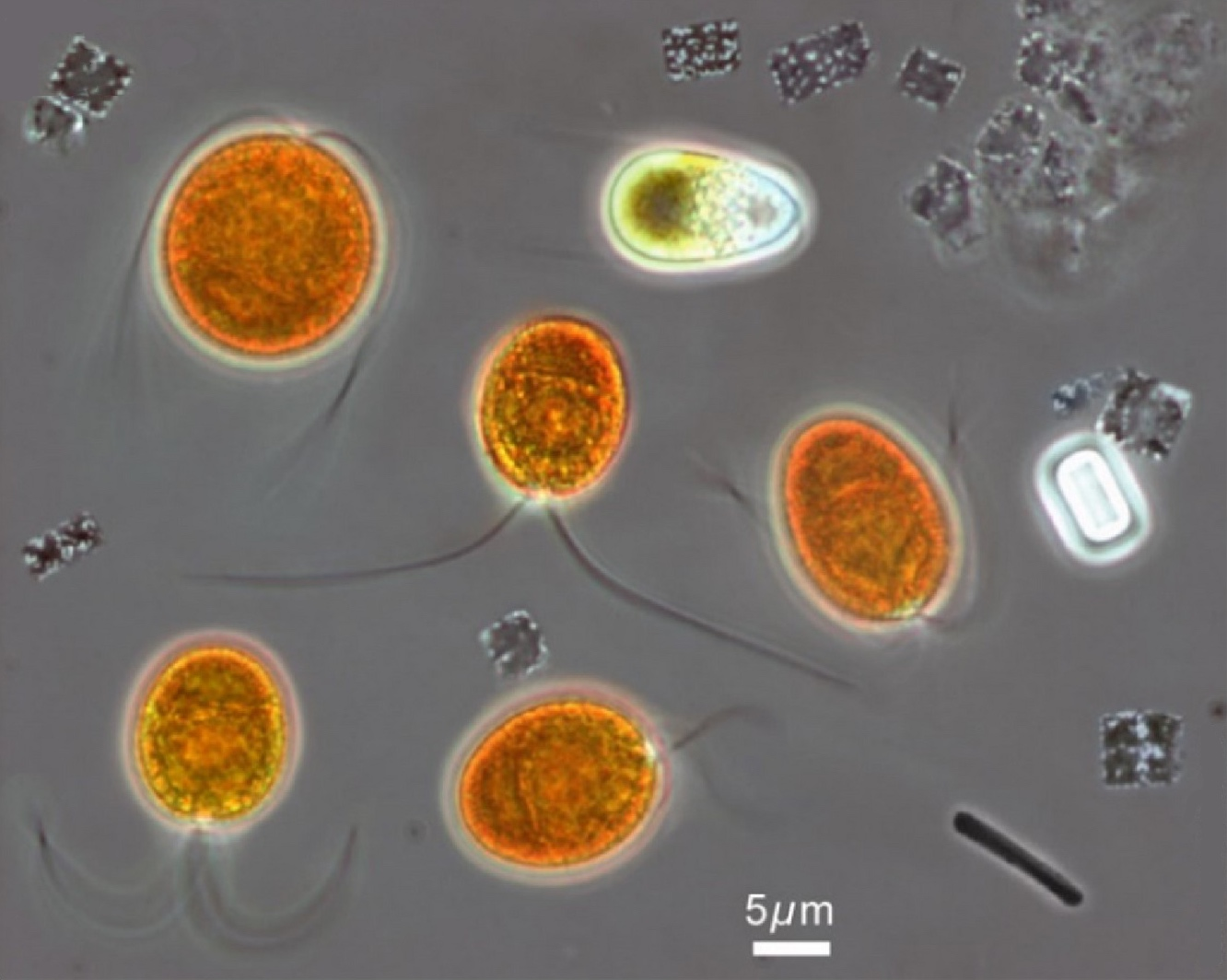
Microscopic image from the hypersaline Lake Tyrrell (salinity> 20% w/v), in which the eukaryotic chlorophyte, Dunaliella salina, can be tentatively identified. Dunaliella salina is grown commercially for the carotenoid, β-carotene, which is widely used as a natural food colorant as well as a precursor to vitamin A. Alongside is the haloarchaeon, Haloquadratum walsbyi, which has flat square-shaped cells with gas vesicles that allow flotation to the surface, most likely to acquire oxygen.

- Acidophile: an organism with optimal growth at high acidity – pH levels of 3.0 or below.
- Alkaliphile: an organism with optimal growth at low acidity – pH levels of 9.0 or above.
- Capnophile: an organism with optimal growth conditions in high concentrations of carbon dioxide. An example would be Mannheimia, a genus of bacteria that inhabit the digestive systems of cattle and sheep.
- Halophile: an organism with optimal growth at a concentration of dissolved salts of 50 g/L (= 5% m/v) or above (for comparison, the salinity of a coral reef is about 35 g/L (= 3.5% m/v)).
- Hyperpiezophile: an organism with optimal growth at hydrostatic pressures above 50 MPa (= 493 atm = 7,252 psi).
- Hyperthermophile: an organism with optimal growth at temperatures above 80 °C (176 °F).
- Metallotolerant: an organism capable of tolerating high levels of dissolved heavy metals in solution, such as copper, cadmium, arsenic, and zinc. Examples include Ferroplasma sp., Cupriavidus metallidurans and GFAJ-1.
- Oligotroph: an organism with optimal growth in nutritionally limited environments.
- Osmophile: an organism with optimal growth in environments with a high sugar concentration.
- Piezophile or barophile: an organism with optimal growth in hydrostatic pressures above 10 MPa (= 99 atm = 1,450 psi).
- Polyextremophile (mixed Latin/Greek compound for affection for many extremes): an omnibus category for organisms which qualify as extremophiles under more than one category.
- Psychrophile or cryophile: an organism with optimal growth at temperatures of 15 °C (59 °F) or lower.
- Radioresistant: organisms resistant to high levels of ionizing radiation, most commonly ultraviolet radiation. This category also includes organisms capable of resisting gamma rays.
- Sulphophile: an organism with optimal growth conditions in high concentrations of sulfur. An example would be Sulfurovum epsilonproteobacteria, a sulfur-oxidizing bacteria that inhabits the ocean floor.
- Thermophile: an organism with optimal growth at temperatures above 45 °C (113 °F).
- Xerophile: an organism with optimal growth at water activity below 0.8.

Examples of extremophile species:
Factor	Example environment / source	Limits	Organisms
High temperature	Hydrothermal vents	110 °C (230 °F) to 122 °C (252 °F)	Pyrolobus fumarii, Pyrococcus furiosus, Methanopyrus kandlerii
Low temperature	Permafrost	−20 °C (−4 °F) to −25 °C (−13 °F)	Rhodotorula glutinis
Alkaline waters	Soda lakes	pH ~11	Psychrobacter, Vibrio, Arthrobacter, Natronobacterium
Acidic waters	Volcanism and acid mine drainage	pH 0.06 to 1.0	Picrophilus oshimae
Ionizing radiation	Cosmic rays and NORMs	1,500 to 6,000 Gy	Deinococcus radiodurans, Rubrobacter, Thermococcus gammatolerans
UV radiation	The Sun	5,000 J/m^{2}	Deinococcus radiodurans, Rubrobacter, Thermococcus gammatolerans
High pressures	Mariana Trench	1,100 bar	Pyrococcus, Colwellia
High salinity waters	Soda lakes and Saline lakes	a_{w} ~ 0.6	Halobacteriaceae, Dunaliella salina, Vibrio
Desiccation	Atacama Desert (Chile), McMurdo Dry Valleys (Antarctica)	~60% relative humidity	Chroococcidiopsis

=== Polyextremophiles ===
There are many classes of extremophiles that range all around the globe; each corresponding to the way its environmental niche differs from mesophilic conditions. These classifications are not exclusive. Many extremophiles fall under multiple categories and are classified as polyextremophiles. For example, organisms living inside hot rocks deep under Earth's surface are thermophilic and piezophilic such as Thermococcus barophilus. A polyextremophile living at the summit of a mountain in the Atacama Desert might be a radioresistant xerophile, a psychrophile, and an oligotroph. Polyextremophiles are well known for their ability to tolerate both high and low pH levels. Note that "tolerant" or "resistant" organisms are not necessarily extremophiles: tolerant or resistant organisms may survive despite harsh conditions instead of thriving in harsh conditions. For example, the tardigrade (Tardigrada spp.), despite being highly resistant to many stresses, is not an extremophile properly speaking.

== In astrobiology ==
Astrobiology is the multidisciplinary field that investigates how life arises, distributes, and evolves in the universe. Astrobiology makes use of physics, chemistry, astronomy, solar physics, biology, molecular biology, ecology, planetary science, geography, and geology to investigate the possibility of life on other worlds and recognize biospheres that might be different from that on Earth. Astrobiologists are interested in extremophiles, as it allows them to map what is known about the limits of life on Earth to potential extraterrestrial environments For example, analogous deserts of Antarctica are exposed to harmful UV radiation, low temperature, high salt concentration and low mineral concentration. These conditions are similar to those on Mars. Therefore, finding viable microbes in the subsurface of Antarctica suggests that there may be microbes surviving in endolithic communities and living under the Martian surface. Research indicates it is unlikely that Martian microbes exist on the surface or at shallow depths, but may be found at subsurface depths of around 100 meters.

Recent research carried out on extremophiles in Japan involved a variety of bacteria including Escherichia coli and Paracoccus denitrificans being subject to conditions of extreme gravity. The bacteria were cultivated while being rotated in an ultracentrifuge at high speeds corresponding to 403,627 g (i.e. 403,627 times the gravity experienced on Earth). P. denitrificans was one of the bacteria which displayed not only survival but also robust cellular growth under these conditions of hyperacceleration which are usually found only in cosmic environments, such as on very massive stars or in the shock waves of supernovas. Analysis showed that the small size of prokaryotic cells is essential for successful growth under hypergravity. The research has implications on the feasibility of panspermia.

On 26 April 2012, scientists reported that lichen survived and showed remarkable results on the adaptation capacity of photosynthetic activity within the simulation time of 34 days under some conditions similar to those on Mars in the Mars Simulation Laboratory (MSL) maintained by the German Aerospace Center (DLR).

On 29 April 2013, scientists at Rensselaer Polytechnic Institute, funded by NASA, reported that, during spaceflight on the International Space Station, microbes seem to adapt to the space environment in ways "not observed on Earth" and in ways that "can lead to increases in growth and virulence".

On 19 May 2014, scientists announced that some microbes, like Tersicoccus phoenicis, may be resistant to methods usually used in spacecraft assembly clean rooms, giving rise to speculation that such microbes could have withstood space travel and are present on the Curiosity rover now on the planet Mars.

On 20 August 2014, scientists confirmed the existence of microorganisms living half a mile below the ice of Antarctica.

In September 2015, scientists from CNR-National Research Council of Italy reported that S. soflataricus survived under Martian radiation at a wavelength that was considered lethal to most bacteria. This discovery is significant because it indicates that not only bacterial spores, but also growing cells can resist strong UV radiation.

In June 2016, scientists from Brigham Young University reported that endospores of Bacillus subtilis were able to survive high speed impacts up to 299±28 m/s, extreme shock, and extreme deceleration. They pointed out that this feature might allow endospores to survive and to be transferred between planets by traveling within meteorites or by experiencing atmosphere disruption. Moreover, they suggested that the landing of spacecraft may also result in interplanetary spore transfer, given that spores can survive high-velocity impact while ejected from the spacecraft onto the planet surface. This is the first study which reported that bacteria can survive in such high-velocity impact. However, the lethal impact speed is unknown.

In August 2020 scientists reported that bacteria that feed on air discovered 2017 in Antarctica are likely not limited to Antarctica after discovering the two genes previously linked to their "atmospheric chemosynthesis" in soil of two other similar cold desert sites, which provides further information on this carbon sink and further strengthens the extremophile evidence that supports the potential existence of microbial life on alien planets.

The same month, scientists reported that bacteria from Earth, particularly Deinococcus radiodurans, were found to survive for three years in outer space, based on studies on the International Space Station. These findings support the notion of panspermia.

== Bioremediation ==
Extremophiles can also be useful players in the bioremediation of contaminated sites as some species are capable of biodegradation under conditions too extreme for classic bioremediation candidate species. Anthropogenic activity causes the release of pollutants that may potentially settle in extreme environments as is the case with tailings and sediment released from deep-sea mining activity. While most bacteria would be crushed by the pressure in these environments, piezophiles can tolerate these depths and can metabolize pollutants of concern if they possess bioremediation potential.

=== Hydrocarbons ===
There are multiple potential destinations for hydrocarbons after an oil spill has settled and currents routinely deposit them in extreme environments. Methane bubbles resulting from the Deepwater Horizon oil spill were found 1.1 kilometers below water surface level and at concentrations as high as 183 μmol per kilogram. The combination of low temperatures and high pressures in this environment result in low microbial activity. However, bacteria that are present including species of Pseudomonas, Aeromonas and Vibrio were found to be capable of bioremediation, albeit at a tenth of the speed they would perform at sea level pressure. Polycyclic aromatic hydrocarbons increase in solubility and bioavailability with increasing temperature. Thermophilic Thermus and Bacillus species have demonstrated higher gene expression for the alkane mono-oxygenase alkB at temperatures exceeding 60 °C (140 °F). The expression of this gene is a crucial precursor to the bioremediation process. Fungi that have been genetically modified with cold-adapted enzymes to tolerate differing pH levels and temperatures have been shown to be effective at remediating hydrocarbon contamination in freezing conditions in the Antarctic.

=== Metals ===
Acidithiobacillus ferrooxidans has been shown to be effective in remediating mercury in acidic soil due to its merA gene making it mercury resistant. Industrial effluent contain high levels of metals that can be detrimental to both human and ecosystem health. In extreme heat environments the extremophile Geobacillus thermodenitrificans has been shown to effectively manage the concentration of these metals within twelve hours of introduction. Some acidophilic microorganisms are effective at metal remediation in acidic environments due to proteins found in their periplasm, not present in any mesophilic organisms, allowing them to protect themselves from high proton concentrations. Rice paddies are highly oxidative environments that can produce high levels of lead or cadmium. Deinococcus radiodurans are resistant to the harsh conditions of the environment and are therefore candidate species for limiting the extent of contamination of these metals.

Some bacteria are known to also use rare earth elements on their biological processes. For example, Methylacidiphilum fumariolicum, Methylorubrum extorquens, and Methylobacterium radiotolerans are known to be able to use lanthanides as cofactors to increase their methanol dehydrogenase activity.

=== Acid mine drainage ===
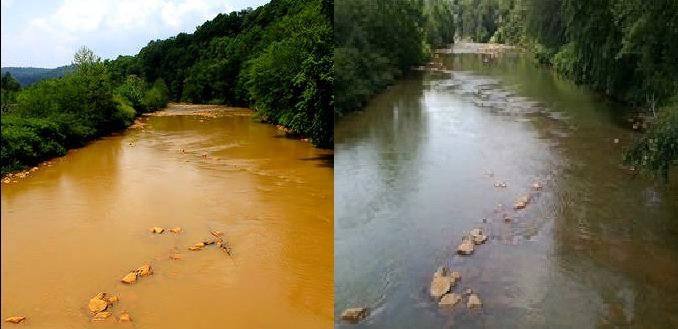
Before (left) and after (right) a cleanup project of the Little Conemaugh River

Acid mine drainage is a major environmental concern associated with many metal mines. This is due to the fact that this highly acidic water can mix with groundwater, streams, and lakes. The drainage turns the pH in these water sources from a more neutral pH to a pH lower than 4. This is close to the acidity levels of battery acid or stomach acid. Exposure to the polluted water can greatly affect the health of plants, humans, and animals. However, a productive method of remediation is to introduce the extremophile, Thiobacillus ferrooxidans. This extremophile is useful for its bioleaching property. It helps to break down minerals in the waste water created by the mine. By breaking down the minerals Thiobacillus ferrooxidans start to help neutralize the acidity of the waste water. This is a way to reduce the environmental impact and help remediate the damage caused by the acid mine drainage leaks.

=== Oil-based, hazardous pollutants in Arctic regions ===
Psychrophilic microbes metabolize hydrocarbons which assists in the remediation of hazardous, oil-based pollutants in the Arctic and Antarctic regions. These specific microbes are used in this region due to their ability to perform their functions at extremely cold temperatures.

=== Radioactive materials ===
Any bacteria capable of inhabiting radioactive mediums can be classified as an extremophile. Radioresistant organisms are therefore critical in the bioremediation of radionuclides. Uranium is particularly challenging to contain when released into an environment and very harmful to both human and ecosystem health. The NANOBINDERS project is equipping bacteria that can survive in uranium rich environments with gene sequences that enable proteins to bind to uranium in mining effluent, making it more convenient to collect and dispose of. Some examples are Shewanella putrefaciens, Geobacter metallireducens and some strains of Burkholderia fungorum.

Radiotrophic fungi, which use radiation as an energy source, have been found inside and around the Chernobyl Nuclear Power Plant.

Radioresistance has also been observed in certain species of macroscopic lifeforms. The lethal dose required to kill up to 50% of a tortoise population is 40,000 roentgens, compared to only 800 roentgens needed to kill 50% of a human population. In experiments exposing lepidopteran insects to gamma radiation, significant DNA damage was detected only at 20 Gy and higher doses, in contrast with human cells that showed similar damage at only 2 Gy.

== Examples and recent findings ==
New sub-types of extremophiles are identified frequently and the sub-category list for extremophiles is always growing. For example, microbial life lives in the liquid asphalt lake, Pitch Lake. Research indicates that extremophiles inhabit the asphalt lake in populations ranging between 10^{6} and 10^{7} cells/gram. Likewise, until recently, boron tolerance was unknown, but a strong borophile was discovered in bacteria. With the recent isolation of Bacillus boroniphilus, borophiles came into discussion. Studying these borophiles may help illuminate the mechanisms of both boron toxicity and boron deficiency.

In July 2019, a scientific study of Kidd Mine in Canada discovered sulfur-breathing organisms which live 7,900 feet (2,400 m) below the surface, and which breathe sulfur in order to survive. These organisms are also remarkable due to eating rocks such as pyrite as their regular food source.

== Biotechnology ==
The thermoalkaliphilic catalase, which initiates the breakdown of hydrogen peroxide into oxygen and water, was isolated from an organism, Thermus brockianus, found in Yellowstone National Park by Idaho National Laboratory researchers. The catalase operates over a temperature range from 30 °C to over 94 °C and a pH range from 6–10. This catalase is extremely stable compared to other catalases at high temperatures and pH. In a comparative study, the T. brockianus catalase exhibited a half-life of 15 days at 80 °C and pH 10 while a catalase derived from Aspergillus niger had a half-life of 15 seconds under the same conditions. The catalase will have applications for removal of hydrogen peroxide in industrial processes such as pulp and paper bleaching, textile bleaching, food pasteurization, and surface decontamination of food packaging.

DNA modifying enzymes such as Taq DNA polymerase and some Bacillus enzymes used in clinical diagnostics and starch liquefaction are produced commercially by several biotechnology companies.

== DNA transfer ==
Over 65 prokaryotic species are known to be naturally competent for genetic transformation, the ability to transfer DNA from one cell to another cell followed by integration of the donor DNA into the recipient cell's chromosome. Several extremophiles are able to carry out species-specific DNA transfer, as described below. However, it is not yet clear how common such a capability is among extremophiles.

The bacterium Deinococcus radiodurans is one of the most radioresistant organisms known. This bacterium can also survive cold, dehydration, vacuum and acid and is thus known as a polyextremophile. D. radiodurans is competent to perform genetic transformation. Recipient cells are able to repair DNA damage in donor transforming DNA that had been UV irradiated as efficiently as they repair cellular DNA when the cells themselves are irradiated. The extreme thermophilic bacterium Thermus thermophilus and other related Thermus species are also capable of genetic transformation.

Halobacterium volcanii, an extreme halophilic (saline tolerant) archaeon, is capable of natural genetic transformation. Cytoplasmic bridges are formed between cells that appear to be used for DNA transfer from one cell to another in either direction.

Sulfolobus solfataricus and Sulfolobus acidocaldarius are hyperthermophilic archaea. Exposure of these organisms to the DNA damaging agents UV irradiation, bleomycin or mitomycin C induces species-specific cellular aggregation. UV-induced cellular aggregation of S. acidocaldarius mediates chromosomal marker exchange with high frequency. Recombination rates exceed those of uninduced cultures by up to three orders of magnitude. Frols et al. and Ajon et al. hypothesized that cellular aggregation enhances species-specific DNA transfer between Sulfolobus cells in order to repair damaged DNA by means of homologous recombination. Van Wolferen et al. noted that this DNA exchange process may be crucial under DNA damaging conditions such as high temperatures. It has also been suggested that DNA transfer in Sulfolobus may be an early form of sexual interaction similar to the more well-studied bacterial transformation systems that involve species-specific DNA transfer leading to homologous recombinational repair of DNA damage (and see Transformation (genetics)).

Extracellular membrane vesicles (MVs) might be involved in DNA transfer between different hyperthermophilic archaeal species. It has been shown that both plasmids and viral genomes can be transferred via MVs. Notably, a horizontal plasmid transfer has been documented between hyperthermophilic Thermococcus and Methanocaldococcus species, respectively belonging to the orders Thermococcales and Methanococcales.

== See also ==
- Earliest known life forms
- Dissimilatory metal-reducing microorganisms
- Extremotroph
- List of microorganisms tested in outer space
- Mesophile, an organism that grows best in moderate temperatures
- Neutrophile, an organism that grows best in a neutral pH level
- RISE project
