= Biological roles of the elements =

The chemical elements that occur naturally on Earth's surface have a wide diversity of roles in the structure and metabolism of living things. They vary greatly in importance, going from being found in every living organism to showing no known use to any of them. Four of these elements (hydrogen, carbon, nitrogen, and oxygen) are essential to every living thing and collectively make up 99% of the mass of protoplasm. Phosphorus and sulfur are also common essential elements, essential to the structure of nucleic acids and amino acids, respectively. Chlorine, potassium, magnesium, calcium and sodium have important roles due to their ready ionization and utility in regulating membrane activity and osmotic potential. The remaining elements found in living things are primarily metals that play a role in determining protein structure. Examples include iron, essential to hemoglobin; and magnesium, essential to chlorophyll. Some elements are essential only to certain taxonomic groups of organisms, particularly the prokaryotes. For instance, some of the lanthanide elements are essential for some prokaryotes, such as methanogens. As shown in the following table, there is strong evidence that 19 of the elements are essential to all living things, and another 17 are essential to some taxonomic groups. Of these 17, most have not been extensively studied, and their biological importance may be greater than currently supposed.

Essential elements
H																		He
Li	Be												B	C	N	O	F	Ne
Na	Mg												Al	Si	P	S	Cl	Ar
K	Ca		Sc	Ti	V	Cr	Mn	Fe	Co	Ni	Cu	Zn	Ga	Ge	As	Se	Br	Kr
Rb	Sr		Y	Zr	Nb	Mo	Tc	Ru	Rh	Pd	Ag	Cd	In	Sn	Sb	Te	I	Xe
Cs	Ba	*	Lu	Hf	Ta	W	Re	Os	Ir	Pt	Au	Hg	Tl	Pb	Bi	Po	At	Rn
Fr	Ra	**	Lr	Rf	Db	Sg	Bh	Hs	Mt	Ds	Rg	Cn	Nh	Fl	Mc	Lv	Ts	Og
		*	La	Ce	Pr	Nd	Pm	Sm	Eu	Gd	Tb	Dy	Ho	Er	Tm	Yb
		**	Ac	Th	Pa	U	Np	Pu	Am	Cm	Bk	Cf	Es	Fm	Md	No

Legend:
The six basic organic elements
Quantity elements
Essential trace elements
Essentiality or function in mammals debated
No evidence for biological action in mammals, but essential or beneficial in some organisms

In the case of the lanthanides, the definition of an essential nutrient as being indispensable and irreplaceable is not completely applicable due to their extreme chemical similarity. The stable early lanthanides La–Nd are known to stimulate the growth of various lanthanide-using organisms, and Sm–Gd show lesser effects for some such organisms. The later elements in the lanthanide series do not appear to have such effects.

The remaining elements are not known to be essential. There appear to be several causes of this.

- Apart from the known essential elements, most elements have only received direct biological study in connection with their significance to human health; this has incidentally included study of some laboratory animals such as chickens and rats, and plants of agricultural importance. There is evidence that certain elements are essential to groups other than humans, but there has been little effort to systematically study any group other than humans or laboratory animals to determine the effects of deficiency of uncommon elements, and for these groups knowledge is largely limited to information that has been gathered incidentally to study other aspects of each organism.
- The noble gases helium, neon, argon, krypton, xenon are non-reactive and have no known direct biological role — however xenon exhibits both anesthetic and neuroprotective side-effects despite usually being considered chemically inert, and can activate at least one human transcription factor. (Radon is radioactive, discussed below.)
- Some elements readily substitute for other, more common elements in molecular structures; e.g. bromine often substitutes for chlorine, or tungsten for molybdenum. Sometimes this substitution has no biological effect; sometimes it has an adverse effect.
- Many elements are benign, meaning that they generally neither help nor harm organisms, but may bioaccumulate. However, since the literature on these elements is almost entirely focused on their role in humans and laboratory animals, some of them may eventually be found to have an essential role in other organisms. In the following table are 56 benign elements.
- A few elements have been found to have a pharmacologic function in humans and possibly other living things. In these cases, a normally nonessential element can treat a disease (often a micronutrient deficiency). An example is fluorine, which reduces the effects of iron deficiency in rats.
- All elements with atomic number 95 or higher are synthetic and radioactive with a very short half-life. These elements have never existed on the surface of the Earth except in minute quantities for very brief time periods. None have any biological significance.

Aluminum warrants special mention because it is the most abundant metal and the third most abundant element in the Earth's crust; despite this, it is not essential for life. With this sole exception, the eight most highly abundant elements in the Earth's crust, making up over 90% of the crustal mass, are also essential for life.

== Overview ==
Z	Element	Essential?		Biological role	Medical uses	Toxicity
Z	Element	Humans	Others	Biological role	Medical uses	Toxicity
1	Hydrogen	Yes	Always	Ubiquitous, essential.		None known.
2	Helium	No	Never	As with other noble gases, has no known biological role.		Has no known harmful role.
3	Lithium	No	Unsure	There is some evidence that lithium deprivation adversely affects multiple functions, especially fertility and adrenal gland function, in rats and goats, and some plants accumulate lithium. However, it is not known to be essential for any organism.	Some medical uses are known, especially in the treatment of mood disorders.	Toxic in some forms.
4	Beryllium	No	Never	Has no known biological role.	Used in certain dental alloys	Toxic to humans, especially via inhalation. Can substitute for magnesium in certain key enzymes, causing malfunction.
5	Boron	No	Plants	In plants, it has important roles in nucleic acid metabolism, carbohydrate and protein metabolism, cell wall synthesis, cell wall structure, membrane integrity and function, and phenol metabolism. Probably essential to animals, for reasons not well understood.		Toxic to both animals and plants.
6	Carbon	Yes	Always	Ubiquitous, essential.		Its oxide is a pollutant.
7	Nitrogen	Yes	Always	Ubiquitous, essential for all forms of life; all proteins and nucleic acids contain substantial amounts of nitrogen.		Toxic in some forms.
8	Oxygen	Yes	Always	Ubiquitous, essential for all forms of life; essentially all biological molecules (not to mention water) contain substantial amounts of oxygen.		In high concentrations, oxygen toxicity can occur.
9	Fluorine	No	Never	While not naturally present in most organisms, brings many positive effects in mammals. Affects bone density in humans and creates fluoroapatite, which makes tooth enamel harder and relatively impervious to chemical action, compared to bone. Improves growth in rats; helps to treat other deficiencies, e.g. of iron.	Widepread medical applications, especially in pharmaceuticals.	Excess fluorine in humans results in fluoride toxicity, and can substitute for iodine, causing goitre.
10	Neon	No	Never	As with other noble gases, has no known biological role.		None known.
11	Sodium	Yes	Always	Essential to animals and plants in many ways, such as osmoregulation and transmission of nerve impulses. Essential to energy metabolism of some bacteria, particularly extremophiles.		Toxic in some forms, and since it is essential to living things, either a lack or an excess can have harmful results.
12	Magnesium	Yes	Always	Essential for almost all living things; needed for chlorophyll, and is a co-factor for many other enzymes.	Multiple medical uses.	Large doses can have toxic effects.
13	Aluminum	No	Never	Has no known biological role.		The metal, or various compounds, can be toxic to humans. In plants, aluminum can be the primary limitation on growth in acidic soils.
14	Silicon	Yes	Often	Essential for connective tissue and bone in birds and mammals. Silica appears in many organisms; e.g. as frustules (shells) of diatoms, spicules of sponges, and phytoliths of plants.	Some medical uses, e.g. cosmetic implants.	Silicosis is a lung disease caused by inhalation of silica dust.
15	Phosphorus	Yes	Always	Ubiquitous, essential for all forms of life; all nucleic acids contain substantial amounts of phosphorus; it is also essential to adenosine triphosphate (ATP), the basis for all cellular energy transfer; and it performs many other essential roles in different organisms.		Toxic in some forms; pure phosphorus is poisonous to humans.
16	Sulfur	Yes	Always	Sulfur is essential and ubiquitous, partly because it is part of the amino acids cysteine and methionine. Many metals that appear as enzyme cofactors are bound by cysteine, and methionine is essential for protein synthesis.		Toxic in some forms.
17	Chlorine	Yes	Always	Chlorine salts are critical for many species, including humans. Its ion is used as an electrolyte, as well as making the hydrochloric acid the stomach uses for digestion. Excessive blood chlorides (hyperchloremia) are a symptom of several diseases; but the condition itself does not have symptoms.		Elemental Cl_{2} is toxic.
18	Argon	No	Never	None known.		None known.
19	Potassium	Yes	Always	Essential for almost all living things, except perhaps some prokaryotes; performs numerous functions, most of which are related to the transport of potassium ions.		Potassium ion in excess causes paralysis and depresses central nervous system activity in humans.
20	Calcium	Yes	Always	Ubiquitous, essential		Appears in various toxic organochemicals; contributes to diseases e.g. kidney stones.
21	Scandium	No	Never	Has no known biological role, but can bioaccumulate in some plants, perhaps because it can substitute for aluminum in some compounds.		Some compounds may be carcinogenic; some forms are mildly toxic to humans.
22	Titanium	No	Unsure	Present in most animals, possibly beneficial to plant growth, but not known to be essential; some plants are hyperaccumulators. Common in medical implants.		The common compounds are nontoxic.
23	Vanadium	Unsure	Often	Can mimic and potentiate the effect of various growth factors such as insulin and epidermal growth factor. Can also affect processes regulated by cAMP. Also used by some bacteria. Dinitrogenases, essential for nitrogen metabolism, normally use molybdenum but in its absence vanadium (or iron) will substitute. Vanadium is also an essential for a variety of peroxidases found in many taxonomic groups, including bromoperoxidases, haloperoxidases, and chloroperoxidases.		Some compounds are toxic, and are implicated in several human diseases of including diabetes, cancer, chlorosis, anemia, and tuberculosis.
24	Chromium	Unsure	Unsure	Appears to be essential in humans. Affects insulin metabolism. Also influences metabolism, replication and transcription of nucleic acids, and decreases the content of corticosteroids in plasma.		Toxic in some forms.
25	Manganese	Yes	Always	Essential for almost all living things, although in very small amounts; it is a cofactor for many classes of enzymes. At least one of these, mitochondrial superoxide dismutase (MnSOD), is present in all aerobic Bacteria and in the mitochondria of all eukaryotes.		Large doses can have toxic effects.
26	Iron	Yes	Always	Essential to almost all living things, usually as a ligand in a protein; it is most familiar as an essential element in the protein hemoglobin.		Toxic in some forms.
27	Cobalt	Yes	Animals	Essential to the metabolism of all animals, as a key constituent of cobalamin, also known as vitamin B12.		Toxic in some forms, probably carcinogenic.
28	Nickel	Yes	Often	As a component of urease, and many other enzymes as well, nickel is needed by most living things in all domains. Nickel hyperaccumulator plants use it to deter herbivory.		Toxic in some forms.
29	Copper	Yes	Always	Essential in many ways; an important component of many enzymes, especially cytochrome c oxidase, which is present in nearly all living things.		Some compounds are toxic; the metal is highly toxic to viruses.
30	Zinc	Yes	Always	Essential, involved in numerous aspects of cellular metabolism (more than 200 different proteins). Some plants are hyperaccumulators. There are also medical uses, e.g. in dentistry.		Some compounds are toxic.
31	Gallium	No	Unsure	Although nonessential, plays a complex role in humans, including concentrating in bone, binding to plasma proteins, and concentrating in malignancies. It is selectively taken up by plants, so there are a variety of possible roles in plant metabolism.	There is limited medical use.	Inhibits iron uptake and metabolism in a variety of plants and bacteria.
32	Germanium	No	Unsure	Some plants will take it up, but it has no known metabolic role.		Some salts are deadly to some bacteria.
33	Arsenic	No	Rarely	Essential to some species. Some marine algae and shrimp contain arsenic compounds.		Toxic to humans in some forms.
34	Selenium	Yes	Always	Selenium, which is an essential element for animals and prokaryotes and is a beneficial element for many plants, is the least-common of all the elements essential to life. Selenium acts as the catalytic center of several antioxidant enzymes, such as glutathione peroxidase, and plays a wide variety of other biological roles.		Toxic in some forms.
35	Bromine	Yes	Often	Essential to membrane architecture and tissue development in animals. Bromine compounds are very common in and presumably essential to a variety of marine organisms, including bacteria, fungi, seaweeds, and diatoms. Most marine organobromine compounds are made by the action of a unique algal enzyme, vanadium bromoperoxidase	May have antibiotic effects in some compounds when it substitutes for chlorine.	Toxic in excessive concentrations, causing the human disease bromism.
36	Krypton	No	Never	As with other noble gases, has no known biological role. It is also the rarest non-radioactive element in the Earth's crust.		None known.
37	Rubidium	No	Unsure	Has no known biological role, although it seems to substitute for potassium, and bioaccumulates in plants.	It has seen limited medical use.	None known.
38	Strontium	No	Rarely	Essential to Acantharean radiolarians, which have skeletons of strontium sulfate. Also essential to some stony corals.	Limited medical use in drugs such as strontium ranelate.	Non-toxic; in humans, it often substitutes for calcium.
39	Yttrium	No	Unsure	Not well understood. It occurs in most organisms and at widely varying concentrations, suggesting it does have a role, but not known whether essential.		Toxic in some forms, and may be carcinogenic.
40	Zirconium	No	Never	Some plants have high uptake, but it does not appear to be essential or even to have a role; benign.		Compounds generally have low toxicity.
41	Niobium	No	Never	Has no known biological role, although it does bioaccumulate in human bone.	Is hypoallergenic and, both alone and in a niobium-titanium alloy, is used in some medical implants including prosthetics, orthopedic implants, and dental implants.	Toxic in some forms.
42	Molybdenum	Yes	Often	Found in many enzymes; essential to all eukaryotes, and to some bacteria. Molybdenum in proteins is bound by molybdopterin or to other chemical moieties to give one of the molybdenum cofactors.		Metallic molybdenum is toxic if ingested.
43	Technetium	No	Never	Nonexistent in nature, and radioactive.		Nonexistent (radioactive).
44	Ruthenium	No	Never	Has no known biological role; it bioaccumulates, but does not appear to have any function. It is extremely rare.		There is a highly toxic oxide, RuO_{4}, but it is not naturally occurring.
45	Rhodium	No	Never	Has no known biological role, and is extremely rare in the Earth's crust.		Toxic in some forms.
46	Palladium	No	Never	Has no known biological role.	Used in some dental amalgams to decrease corrosion and increase the metallic lustre of the final restoration.	Toxic in some forms.
47	Silver	No	Never	No known biological role.	Antibiotics, mainly; also dental fillings.	Can produce a variety of toxic effects in humans and other animals; also toxic to various microorganisms.
48	Cadmium	No	Rarely	A carbonic anhydrase using cadmium has been found in some marine diatoms that inhabit environments with very low zinc availability; the cadmium evidently provides a similar function. Many plants bioaccumulate cadmium, which deters herbivory. Cadmium deprivation in goats and rats leads to depressed growth, but has not been shown to be essential.		Cadmium poisoning is widely recognized in humans, but has not been described in other organisms. In general, cadmium acts by substituting for calcium, zinc, or iron, and can disrupt biochemical pathways dependent upon those metals.
49	Indium	No	Never	Has no known biological role.		Highly toxic to humans in fairly small doses; mildly toxic to plants, comparable to aluminum; may inhibit growth of some bacteria.
50	Tin	No	Never	In mammals, deprivation causes impaired reproduction and other abnormal growth, suggesting that it is an essential element. Tin may have a role in tertiary structure of proteins. Some plants are tin hyperaccumulators, possibly to deter herbivory.		Toxic in some forms, especially the organotin compounds, which include many potent biocides.
51	Antimony	No	Never	Has no known biological role, but has a variety of uses in medicine, e.g. antibacterial.		Some compounds are highly toxic to humans.
52	Tellurium	No	Never	Is not known to be essential to any organism, but is metabolized by humans, typically through methylation.		Toxic in some forms; the sodium salt is fatal to humans in small doses, and the oxide causes severe bad breath.
53	Iodine	Yes	Always	Iodine has a role in biochemical pathways of organisms from all biological kingdoms, indicating it is uniformly essential to life	Widely used in medicine, mainly for treatment of goitre and for its antibacterial properties.	Highly toxic to humans in its elemental form.
54	Xenon	No	Never	Has no known biological role.		None known.
55	Caesium	No	Never	Has no known biological role.		Can substitute for potassium (a biologically essential element) with possible adverse effects, particularly if the substitution is of radioactive cesium, which was the primary biologically active isotope released in the 1986 Chernobyl nuclear disaster.
56	Barium	No	Never	Has no known biological role, but a variety of plants concentrate it from the soil, and it has a variety of uses in medicine.		Some compounds are toxic. In humans, barium ions affect the nervous system.
57	Lanthanum	No	Rarely	The methanol dehydrogenase of the methanotrophic bacterium Methylacidiphilum fumariolicum SolV requires a lanthanide cofactor, lanthanum, cerium, praseodymium, or neodymium (or possibly other lanthanides) but it appears that any of these lanthanides can perform this function, so lanthanum is only essential if no other suitable lanthanides are available. Among plants, Carya accumulates lanthanum and other lanthanides, perhaps as an adaptation to certain site-limiting environmental stresses.		The chloride is mildly toxic to humans.
58	Cerium	No	Rarely	The methanol dehydrogenase of the methanotrophic bacterium Methylacidiphilum fumariolicum SolV requires a lanthanide cofactor, lanthanum, cerium, praseodymium, or neodymium (or possibly other lanthanides) but it appears that any of these lanthanides can perform this function, so cerium is only essential if no other suitable lanthanides are available. Has medical uses, e.g. in burn treatment.		Can substitute for calcium with possible adverse effects, and in metallic form, is mildly toxic.
59	Praseodymium	No	Rarely	The methanol dehydrogenase of the methanotrophic bacterium Methylacidiphilum fumariolicum SolV requires a lanthanide cofactor, lanthanum, cerium, praseodymium, or neodymium (or possibly other lanthanides) but it appears that any of these lanthanides can perform this function, so praseodymium is only essential if no other suitable lanthanides are available.		Some forms are mildly toxic to humans.
60	Neodymium	No	Rarely	The methanol dehydrogenase of the methanotrophic bacterium Methylacidiphilum fumariolicum SolV requires a lanthanide cofactor, lanthanum, cerium, praseodymium, or neodymium (or possibly other lanthanides) but it appears that any of these lanthanides can perform this function, so neodymium is only essential if no other suitable lanthanides are available.		Toxic in some forms. Anticoagulant.
61	Promethium	No	Never	Has no known biological role; as it is radioactive with a short half-life, it is very rare and is seldom present for long.		Radioactive.
62	Samarium	No	Rarely	Has no known biological role, although it can bioaccumulate in some plants.	One radioisotope is approved for medical use.	Toxic in some forms.
63	Europium	No	Rarely	Has no known function in humans, and is not taken up by plants.		Possible low toxicity in some forms.
64	Gadolinium	No	Rarely	Has no known function in humans, and is not taken up by plants.	There has been limited use in experimental medicine.	Soluble salts are mildly toxic. See medical discussion in Gadolinium: Safety.
65	Terbium	No	Rarely	Has no known biological role, but is probably similar to other lanthanides such as cerium and lanthanum, i.e., not known to be essential. Terbium is also one of the rarer lanthanides.		Toxic in some forms.
66	Dysprosium	No	Never	Has no known biological role.		Some salts have low toxicity.
67	Holmium	No	Never	This lanthanide has no known biological roles, and is not taken up by plants.	There are medical uses; for example, holmium-containing nanoparticles are biocompatible and facilitate NMR imaging.	Some salts are known to be toxic to humans.
68	Erbium	No	Never	Has no known function in humans, and is not taken up by plants.		Soluble salts are mildly toxic.
69	Thulium	No	Never	No known function in humans, and is not taken up by plants.		Toxic in some forms.
70	Ytterbium	No	Never	No known function in humans, where it concentrates in bones. Not taken up by plants.		Toxic in some forms.
71	Lutetium	No	Never	This lanthanide has no known biological roles, and is not taken up by plants.		Mildly toxic to humans in some forms.
72	Hafnium	No	Never	Has no known biological role.		Salts have low toxicity.
73	Tantalum	No	Never	Has no known biological role.	Since it is biocompatible, it is used in medical implants, e.g. skull plates.	Has not been found to be toxic, though some patients with tantalum implants have shown a mildly allergic reaction.
74	Tungsten	No	Rarely	A (presumably essential) component of a few bacterial enzymes, and is the heaviest biologically essential element. Appears to be essential in ATP metabolism of some thermophilic archaea. Can substitute for molybdenum in some proteins. Some plants hyperaccumulate it, though its function is unknown.		Toxic, at least to animals, in some forms.
75	Rhenium	No	Never	Has no known biological role, and is extremely rare in the Earth's crust.		None known.
76	Osmium	No	Never	None known. Osmium is very rare, substantially more so than any element essential to life.		The oxide is toxic to humans.
77	Iridium	No	Never	Due to its extreme rarity, it has no biological role.		The chloride is moderately toxic to humans.
78	Platinum	No	Never	Has no known biological role.	Component of the drug cisplatin, which is highly effective in treating some forms of cancer.	Toxic in some forms. Contact can promote an allergic reaction (platinosis) in humans.
79	Gold	No	Never	Although some plants bioaccumulate gold, no living organism is known to require it.	There are medical uses, including treatment of rheumatoid arthritis and fabrication of dental implants.	Some gold salts used in medicine have adverse side effects.
80	Mercury	No	Never	Although nearly ubiquitous in the environment, mercury has no known biological role.	Traditionally used in medicine and dental fillings, it is now avoided due to toxic side effects.	Can inactivate certain enzymes, as a result, both the metal and some compounds (especially methylmercury) are harmful to most life forms; there is a long and complex history of mercury poisoning in humans.
81	Thallium	No	Never	Has no known biological role.	Medically, it was used for many years to induce hair loss, but this has ended due to its numerous other toxic effects on human health.	It is very toxic and there is evidence that the vapor is both teratogenic and carcinogenic. It can displace potassium in humans affecting the central nervous system. Thallium poisoning has a long history in humans, especially as it has sometimes been a preferred poison.
82	Lead	No	Never	Pb deprivation leads to suboptimal growth of rats, along with anemia, and reduced function of a variety of enzymes; but results have been inconclusive, and the effects may be pharmacologic.		Toxic in some forms, teratogenic, and carcinogenic; historically, lead poisoning has frequently been widespread in human societies. It seems to have been rarely documented in other organisms.
83	Bismuth	No	Never	Has no known biological role.	Variety of uses in medicine, e.g. in antiulcer, antibacterial, anti-HIV and radiotherapeutic uses.	Slightly toxic, perhaps the least toxic heavy metal, though poisonings have been reported.
84	Polonium	No	Never	Has no known biological role, and due to its short half-life, is nearly nonexistent outside of research facilities.		Both highly toxic and radioactive.
85	Astatine	No	Never	None known.		Radioactive.
86	Radon	No	Never	Has no known biological role.	Historically, there have been various medical uses.	Radioactive, with a variety of documented harmful effects on human health.
87	Francium	No	Never	Due to its very short half-life, there is almost no potential for a living thing to be exposed to it.	Even synthesis cannot produce more than minute quantities before it decays, so there is no medical use.	Radioactive.
88	Radium	No	Never	Has no known biological role; as it is radioactive it is very rare.	Various medical uses in the past.	Radioactive; historically, there have been many cases of radium poisoning, most notably in the case of the Radium Girls.
89	Actinium	No	Never	Has no known biological role.		Radioactive.
90	Thorium	No	Never	Has no known biological role.		Radioactive.
91	Protactinium	No	Never	Has no known biological role; as it is radioactive with a short half-life, it is very rare and is seldom present for long.		Both toxic and highly radioactive.
92	Uranium	No	Rarely	Some bacteria reduce uranium and use it as a terminal electron acceptor for respiration with acetate as electron donor. Some bacteria hyperaccumulate uranium.		Radioactive, and most compounds are also chemically toxic to humans.
93	Neptunium	No	Never	Has no known biological role.		Radioactive.
94	Plutonium	No	Never	Has no known biological role, and is extremely rare in the Earth's crust.	Plutonium-238 is used as an energy source in some heart pacemakers.	Both toxic and radioactive.

== See also ==
- Rehder, Dieter (2015). "The role of vanadium in biology". Metallomics. 7 (5): 730–742. doi:10.1039/C4MT00304G. PMID 25608665.
- https://www.britannica.com/science/transition-metal/Biological-functions-of-transition-metals
- Wackett, Lawrence P.; Dodge, Anthony G.; Ellis, Lynda B. M. (February 2004). "Microbial Genomics and the Periodic Table". Applied and Environmental Microbiology. 70 (2): 647–655. Bibcode:2004ApEnM..70..647W. doi:10.1128/aem.70.2.647-655.2004. PMC 348800. PMID 14766537.
