= Delftia lacustris =

Scientific classification
- Domain: Bacteria
- Kingdom: Pseudomonadati
- Phylum: Pseudomonadota
- Class: Betaproteobacteria
- Order: Burkholderiales
- Family: Comamonadaceae
- Genus: Delftia
- Species: D. lacustris

Binomial name
- Delftia lacustris Jørgensen et al. 2009, sp. nov.

Type strain
- DSM 21246, Jorgensen 332, LMG 24775

Species of bacterium

Delftia lacustris is a Gram-negative, nonfermentative, motile, rod-shaped bacterium from the family Comamonadaceae, which was isolated from mesotrophic lake water in Denmark. It has the ability to degrade peptidoglycan through chitinase and lysozyme activity.

== Biology and biochemistry ==
Delftia lacustris is a Gram-negative, nonfermentative, motile bacterium. The cells are rod shaped, and are 2.3±0.7 μm long and 0.7±0.1 μm in diameter. Growth occurs at pH 5–10, temperatures of 3–37 °C, and salinities of 0–6 g/L. Growth is ideal at pH 6–7, 25 °C, and 1 g/L NaCl. D. lacustris is capable of nitrate reduction, but not denitrification. It is positive for acid and alkaline phosphatases, chitinases, and phosphohydrolase. Many compounds can be used as carbon and energy sources.

Delftia lacustris is resistant to heavy metal toxicity from Cr(VI), Hg(II), Pb(II), and Cd(II). It can also neutralize selenite and selenate through intracellular reduction that produces red elemental-Se. Selenite detoxification is facilitated by glutathione-bound thiol groups. Selenite concentrations can be reduced by 60-72% under ideal conditions.

=== Applications ===
The LC-Z strain of Delftia lacustris isolated from polluted wastewaters is able to degrade naphthalene, 2-methylnaphthalene, benzene, and toluene. This strain is halotolerant and resistant to heavy metals Cr(VI), Hg(II), Pb(II), and Cd(II). LC-Z has been proposed for polycyclic aromatic hydrocarbon (PAH) degradation in combined pollution environments due to its ability to degrade organic compounds in the presence of heavy metals and high salinity.

Co-cultures Delftia lacustris with Phanerochaete chrysosporium could be used for the bioremediation of petrochemical wastewaters by simultaneously neutralizing selenite and phenols. Bacterial reduction of selenite protects P. chrysosporium against toxicity, while fungal degradation of phenols protects D. lacustris against toxicity.

Delftia lacustris has been proposed for use as a biocontrol agent to protect tomato plants against phytopathogens. Plants growing in soil that contains D. lacustris are less susceptible to root rot and wilt disease. Enzymatic chitinase and local nutrient depletion reduce the risk of phytopathogenic infections.

== Pathogenesis ==
Delftia lacustris has been reported as a causative agent for nosocomial bacteremia, endocarditis, keratitis, and ocular infections. Four possible and two confirmed cases of D. lacustris infections have been reported to have occurred in men of at least 40 years of age. Multidrug resistance to aminoglycosides and other antibiotics has been reported. Infections caused by D. lacustris, D. acidovorans, and D. tsuruhatensis are difficult to distinguish using commercial methods and are often mistaken for one another.
