= Histidine transaminase =

Identifiers
- EC no.: 2.6.1.38
- CAS no.: 37277-92-2

Databases
- IntEnz: IntEnz view
- BRENDA: BRENDA entry
- ExPASy: NiceZyme view
- KEGG: KEGG entry
- MetaCyc: metabolic pathway
- PRIAM: profile
- PDB structures: RCSB PDB PDBe PDBsum
- Gene Ontology: AmiGO / QuickGO
Search
- PMC: articles
- PubMed: articles
- NCBI: proteins

Histidine transaminase (EC 2.6.1.38) is an enzyme that catalyzes the chemical reaction

histidine
+
α-ketoglutaric acid
imidazole-4-pyruvic acid
+
L-glutamic acid

The two substrates of this enzyme characterised from Escherichia coli and Pseudomonas acidovorans are L-histidine and α-ketoglutaric acid. Its products are imidazole-4-pyruvic acid and L-glutamic acid.

This enzyme is a transferase, specifically a transaminase, which transfer nitrogenous groups. The systematic name of this enzyme class is L-histidine:2-oxoglutarate aminotransferase. Other names in common use include histidine aminotransferase, and histidine-2-oxoglutarate aminotransferase. It participates in histidine metabolism.
