= Metallotolerant =

Extremophile organism that tolerates high concentrations of dissolved heavy metals

Metallotolerants are extremophile organisms that are able to survive in environments with a high concentration of dissolved heavy metals. They can be found in environments containing arsenic, cadmium, copper, and zinc. Known metallotolerants include Ferroplasma sp. and Cupriavidus metallidurans.

Metallotolerants adapt to their environment by reducing energy loss by excreting less. Many metallotolerant microbes utilise strategies to perform bioremediation, which is seen as a productive way of survival.

Sinorhizobium sp. M14 is a metallotolerant bacterium. Plants can also survive in highly metallic conditions. For example, Noccaea caerulescens is a metallotolerent plant.
