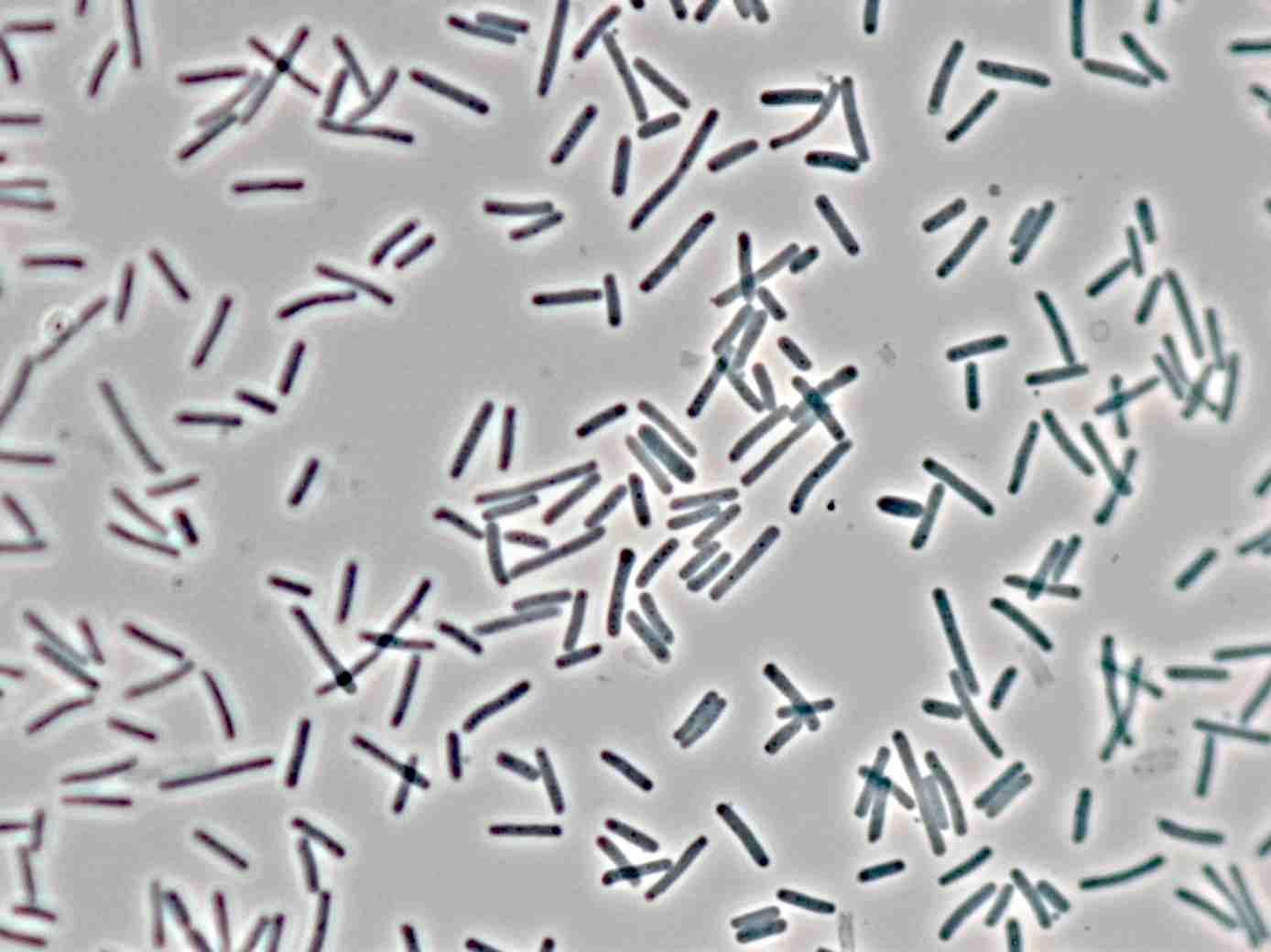

Scientific classification
- Domain: Bacteria
- Kingdom: Pseudomonadati
- Phylum: Pseudomonadota
- Class: Betaproteobacteria
- Order: Burkholderiales
- Family: Comamonadaceae
- Genus: Delftia
- Species: D. litopenaei

Binomial name
- Delftia litopenaei Chen et al. 2012

Type strain
- BCRC 80212, LMG 25724, wsw-7

= Delftia litopenaei =

Species of bacterium

Delftia litopenaei is a Gram-negative, short-rod-shaped, non-spore-forming, motile bacterium from the Comamonadaceae family, which was isolated from a freshwater shrimp culture pond in Taiwan. It has the ability to accumulate poly-β-hydroxybutyrate.
