= Extremotroph =

Organisms that feed on matter not typically considered food

An extremotroph (from Latin extremus meaning "extreme" and Greek troph (τροφ) meaning "food") is an organism that feeds on matter that is not typically considered to be food to most life on Earth. Its definition is anthropocentric.

Extremophily and extremotrophy focus on a single environmental extreme but many extremophiles may fall into multiple categories, for example, organisms living inside hot rocks deep under the Earth's surface.

== Examples ==
- Pestalotiopsis microspora: plastic eater
- Halomonas titanicae: metal eater
- Geotrichum candidum: compact disk eater
- Aspergillus fumigatus: printed circuit board eater
- Deinococcus radiodurans: radioactive waste eater
- Actinobacteria from arid and desert habitats
- Cold-tolerant cyanobacteria found in polar ice shelves

== Industrial uses ==
Extremotrophs are used as bioremediation and biodegradation agents.

== See also ==
- Chemotroph
- Extremophile
- Heterotroph
- Lithoautotroph
