= Delftia =

Scientific classification
- Domain: Bacteria
- Kingdom: Pseudomonadati
- Phylum: Pseudomonadota
- Class: Betaproteobacteria
- Order: Burkholderiales
- Family: Comamonadaceae
- Genus: Delftia; Wen et al. 1999

Type species
- Delftia acidovorans

Genus of bacteria

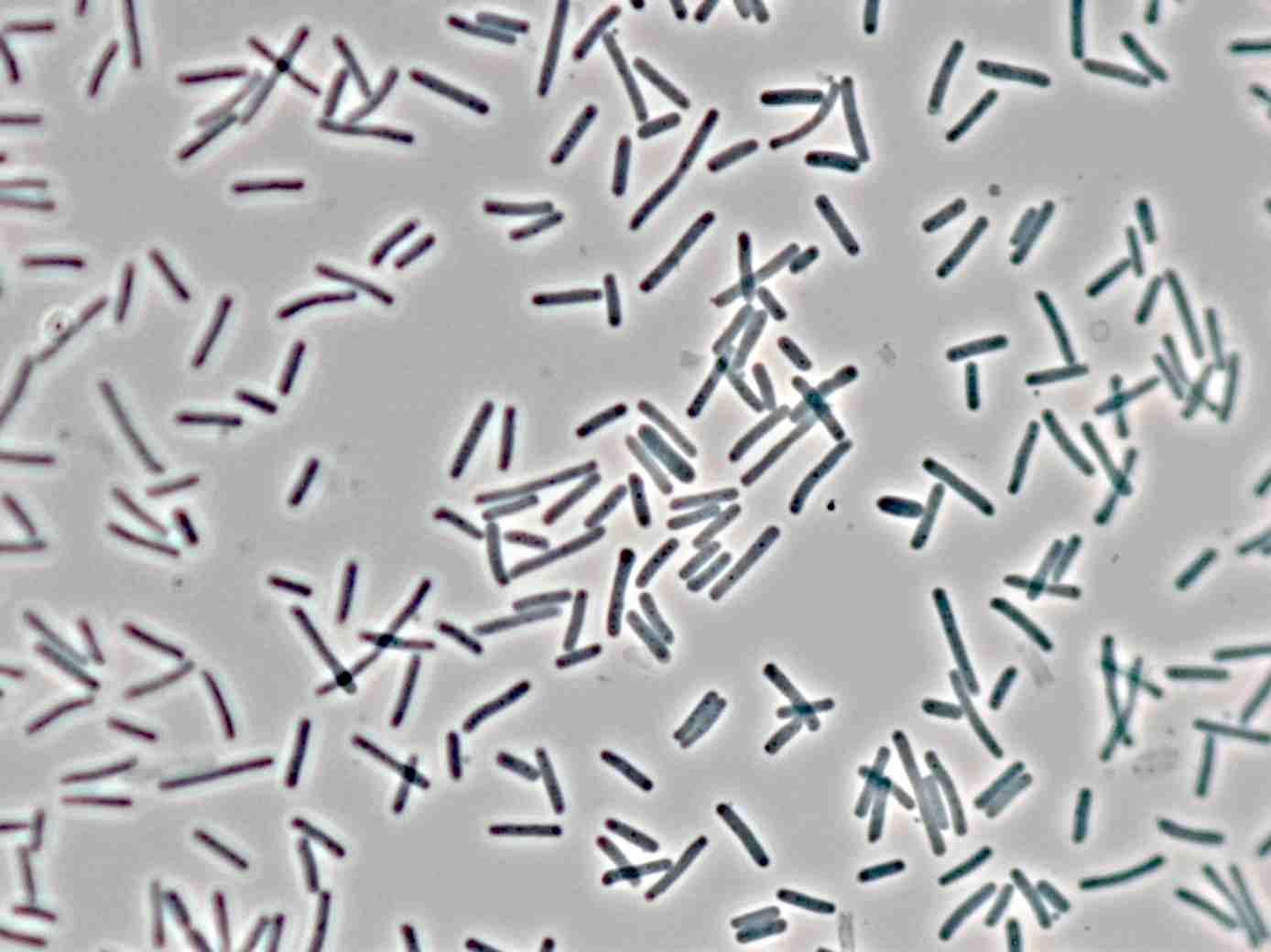

Delftia is a genus of Gram-negative bacteria that was first isolated from soil in Delft, Netherlands. The species is named after both the city, and in honor of pioneering research in the field of bacteriology that occurred in Delft. Cells in the genus Delftia are rod shaped and straight or slightly curved. Cells occur singly or in pairs, are 0.4–0.8 ɥm wide and 2.5–4.1 μm long. Delftia species are motile by flagella, nonsporulating, and chemo-organotrophic.

== Species ==
- D. acidovorans
- D. deserti
- D. lacustris
- D. litopenaei
- D. tsuruhatensis
- D. rhizosphaerae

== Notable Characteristics ==
Delftia species are known for their unique metabolic abilities to break down or transform a variety of pollutants. They can degrade acetaminophen, PAHs, chloroaniline, and herbicides. They can also detoxify heavy metals, such as cadmium and gold. Delftia species are also opportunistic pathogens that can cause a wide variety of infections such as pneumonia, sepsis and peritonitis in immunocompromised patients.
