= Metal toxicity =

Harmful effects of certain metals

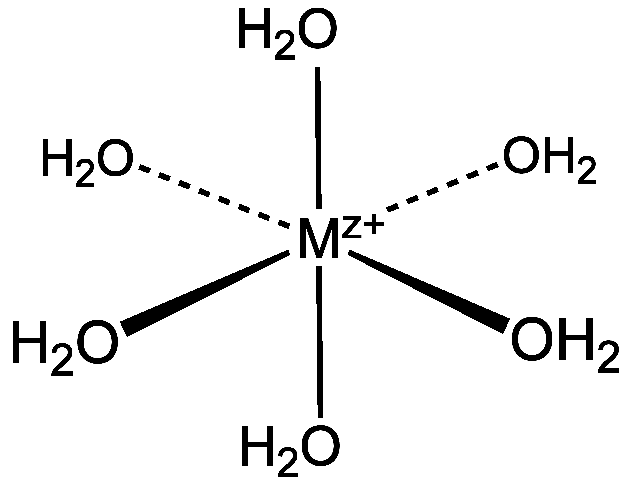
Structure of a metal aquo complex, a typical soluble form for many metal ions in water

Metal toxicity or metal poisoning is toxicity affecting plants, animals, or humans due to excessive concentration of metals. At low concentrations, metals such as copper, iron, manganese, and zinc are essential nutrients obtained through the diet supporting health, but have toxicity at high exposure concentrations. Other metals having no biological roles in animals, but with potential for toxicity include arsenic, cadmium, lead, mercury, and thallium. Exposure to metals, primarily due to occupational exposure or environmental pollution, can increase metal concentration into hazardous range.

Some metals are toxic when they form poisonous soluble compounds which interfere with enzyme systems, such as superoxide dismutase, catalase, or glutathione peroxidase. Only soluble metal-containing compounds are toxic by forming coordination complexes, which consist of a metal ion surrounded by ligands. Ligands can range from water in metal aquo complexes to alkyl groups, as in tetraethyl lead.

Toxic metal complexes can be detoxified by conversion to insoluble derivatives or by binding them in rigid molecular environments using chelating agents. An option for treatment of metal poisoning may be chelation therapy, which involves the administration of chelation agents to remove metals from the body.

== Terminology ==
A toxic heavy metal is a common but misleading term for a metal-like element noted for its potential toxicity. Not all heavy metals are toxic and some toxic metals are not heavy. The International Union of Pure and Applied Chemistry (IUPAC), which standardizes nomenclature, says the term "'heavy metals' is both meaningless and misleading". The IUPAC report focuses on the legal and toxicological implications of describing "heavy metals" as toxins when there is no scientific evidence to support a connection. The density implied by the adjective "heavy" has almost no biological consequences, and pure metals are rarely the biologically active substance. This characterization has been echoed by numerous reviews. The most widely used toxicology textbook, Casarett and Doull's Toxicology, uses "toxic metal", not "heavy metals". Nevertheless many scientific and science-related articles, including medical texts, continue to use "heavy metal" as a term for toxic substances.

== Sources ==
Unlike most other toxins, elemental metals are not created or destroyed by humans. Toxic metals are found naturally in the earth, and become concentrated as a result of human activities or altered chemically, potentially increasing toxic effects. Some natural effects also increase toxic metals, including erosion and volcanoes. In some cases geochemical processes, such as accumulation in peat soils that are then released when drained for agriculture. Sources include mining, refining, or fabrication, industrial and urban runoff, sewage, pesticides on crops, metal pipes carrying potable water, traffic pollution, coal-burning emissions, and various other industrial and urban outputs.

=== Occupational exposure ===
==== Gold mining ====
Artisanal small-scale gold miners are at high risk to exposure of metal toxicants. While there is a wide array of hard metals that are toxic, mercury poses the greatest risk from inhalation and ingestion from environmental contamination.

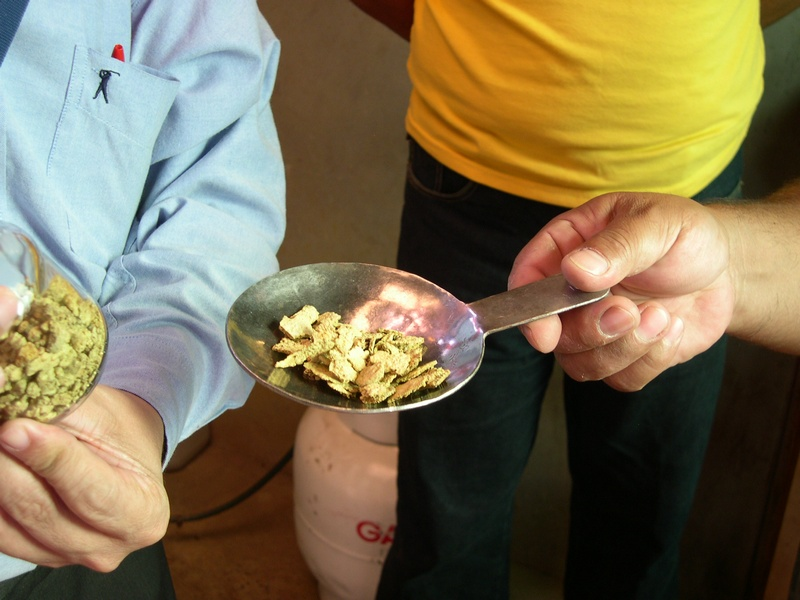
Mercury being mixed with gold-containing materials to extract gold

Mercury is commonly used in small scale gold mining. To do this, large amounts of mercury are usually mixed with gold-containing materials to create a gold-mercury alloy called amalgam. To separate the gold, the amalgam is heated in a furnace causing the mercury to vaporize. During this process, miners are directly exposed to mercury vapors, and surrounding communities may be indirectly exposed through contaminated air, water, and soil.

Continuous high levels of mercury vapor inhalation can cause a variety of health effects. Inhalation may result in tremors, mood swings, muscle weakness, memory loss, or headaches. Prolonged exposure can lead to kidney damage, respiratory failure, and even death. Ingestion of mercury through contaminated water, food, or soil pose great risk to pregnant women and their developing fetuses. When born, this can impair the infants' cognitive functions, memory, language development, and fine motor skills.

Despite its widespread use across countries, mercury exposure in artisanal small-scale gold mining is preventable. Mercury-free techniques like direct smelting result in gold recovery without the need of mercury resulting in the elimination of mercury. In this method, borax is used to decrease the viscosity and melting temperature of non-gold minerals so they can be easily separated from the gold. This not only results in improved worker and community health but also lower in cost and eco-friendly.

==== Construction and renovation ====
In a 2022 report on workplace lead exposure trends, the US CDC notes that construction is among the top four main industries at risk for lead exposure. In Ghana, workers who paint or spray/paint have been tested with the highest prevalence of elevated blood lead levels in a study conducted on blood lead levels in high-risk occupational groups. Amongst different paint usage in Iran, a small study found that car and building painters have elevated blood lead levels, in which car painters had higher blood lead levels than building painters.

==== Agricultural workers ====
Arsenic exposure remains a major concern in agricultural communities that rely on untreated groundwater for crop irrigation and drinking. Studies have found higher urinary arsenic levels among farm workers exposed to contaminated well water and pesticides.

==== Welders ====
People who work as welders can be exposed to metal fumes because welding uses extremely high heat, which turns the metal into very small airborne particles. These fumes often contain metals like manganese, chromium, nickel, and lead, depending on the materials being welded. Breathing in these particles over time can lead to different health issues, including neurological symptoms associated with manganese and lung irritation from the fumes. Stainless steel welding can also create hexavalent chromium, which is a known carcinogen. Exposures to metals are regulated in most countries. In the US, the Occupational Safety and Health Administration (OSHA) sets permissible exposure limits for metals found in welding fumes, while the National Institute for Occupational Safety and Health (NIOSH) identifies recommended exposure limits. Using some industrial hygiene controls such as local exhaust ventilation, fume extraction systems, respirators, and routine air monitoring can help protect welders from harmful metal exposure. Because welding is widely used in construction and manufacturing and many more occupations, controlling metal fumes is essential for maintaining worker health and safety.

==== Metal recycling ====
Occupational exposure to PBDEs from e-waste and battery recycling has been found to be a common risk for workers. In southern China, workers have been observed to have high blood PBDE concentrations. E-waste surface dust can also be inhaled as fumes, or dermal contact. Dust particles can become suspended in air, contributing to air pollution, or leach into water and soils. Uncontrolled e-waste handling also poses a hazard to public health, another study has shown that vegetables near e-waste sites have been found to be contaminated with PBDEs.

=== Environmental pollution ===
When metal toxicity in the environment is suspected, pathologies in fish, clams, birds, insects, and vegetation may serve as signals for contamination and toxicities. Physiological mechanisms of metal toxicity may have a spectrum of effects, ranging from changes in behavior and symptoms of illness, to death of small animal species.

Toxic metal particles in ecosystems may remain for hundreds or even thousands of years, with potentially millions of people exposed to high concentrations at some point in their lives. Commonly, there is no visible evidence of metals pollution in soil or water. The geographical extent of sources may be very large. For example, up to one-sixth of China's arable land might be affected by heavy metal contamination.

== Major toxic metals ==
Rate disease burden lead

Metals with multiple toxic effects include:

- Arsenic poisoning (As) mainly arises from ground water naturally containing high concentrations of arsenic in the supply of drinking water.

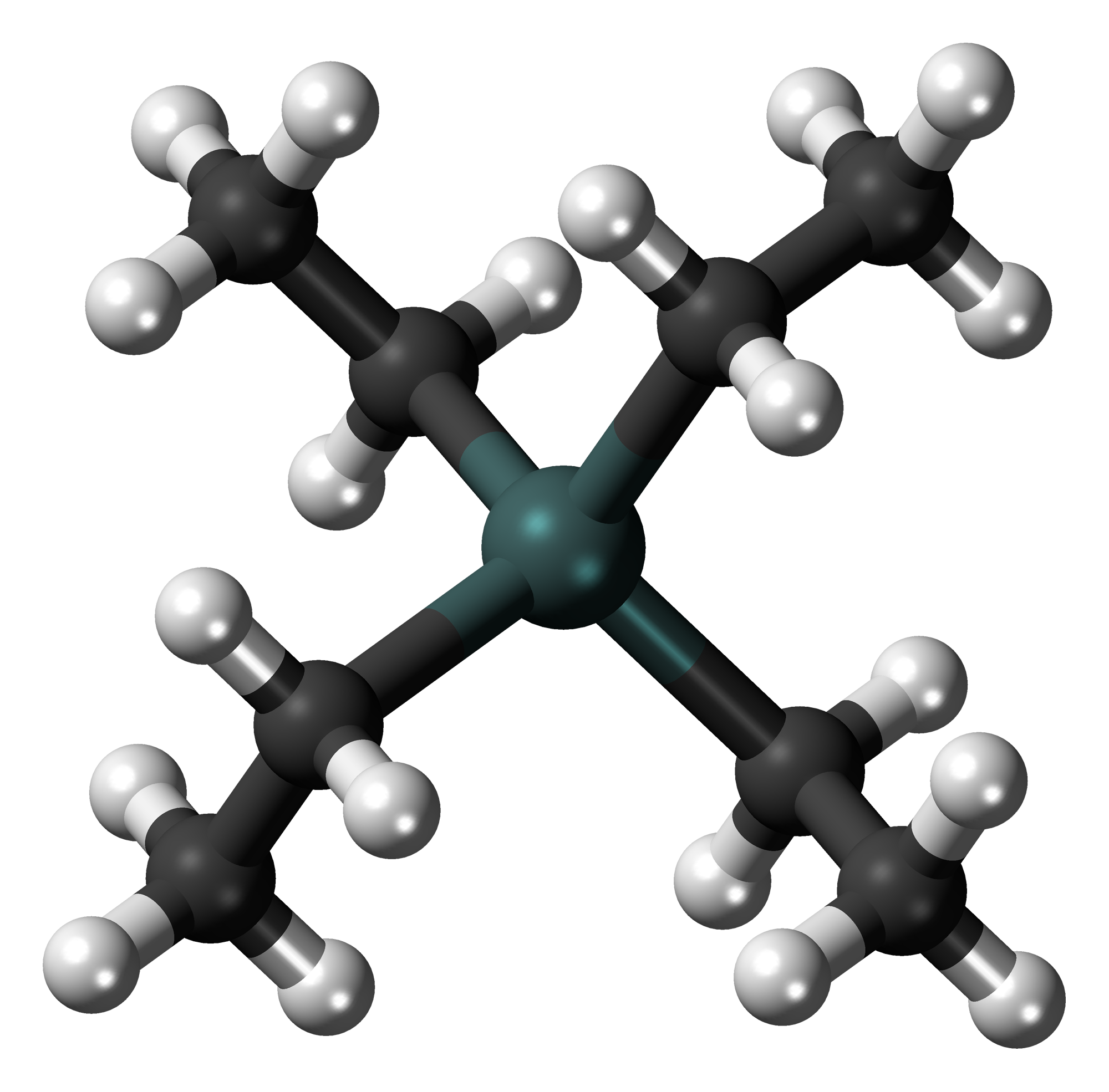
Tetraethyl lead use in gasoline rose during the 1940s then declined in the 1980s.

- Lead poisoning (Pb), in contrast to arsenic poisoning, is caused by industrial materials, such as leaded gasoline and lead leached from plumbing. Use of leaded gasoline has declined precipitously since the 1970s. Lead (from lead(II) azide or lead styphnate used in firearms) gradually accumulates at firearms training grounds, contaminating the local environment and exposing range employees to a risk of lead poisoning.
- Beryllium poisoning (Be) is attributed to the ability of Be^{2+} to replace Mg^{2+} in some enzymes. Be has been classified by one agency as a carcinogen.
- Cadmium poisoning (Cd) came into focus with the discovery of itai-itai disease due to cadmium-contaminated waters resulting from mining in the Toyama Prefecture starting around 1912. The term refers to the severe pains (Japanese: 痛い, romanized: itai) people with the condition felt in the spine and joints. Cd^{2+} is thought to accumulate in the kidneys, where it tightly binds to the sulfur in cysteine-containing proteins. Cadmium is also present as a material used in many electronic devices, thus it can leach into groundwater after being disposed of into landfills of electronic waste.
- Chromium poisoning (Cr) is primarily due to hexavalent chromium, Cr^{+6}, creating as a side effect of industrial processes. While hexavalent chromium is a known human carcinogen, and it has become widespread in the environment, the impact of environmental contamination with this element are not known.
- Mercury poisoning (Hg) came into sharp focus with the discovery of Minamata disease, named for the Japanese city of Minamata. In 1956, a factory in the city released methylmercury in the industrial wastewater resulting in thousands of deaths and many other health problems. This incident alerted the world to the phenomenon of bioaccumulation. While all mercury compounds are toxic, organomercury compounds are especially dangerous because they are readily absorbed from the skin and can cross the blood–brain barrier to cause irreversible brain damage. Methylmercury and related compounds are thought to bind to the sulfur of cysteinyl residues in proteins.
- Nickel causes a contact dermatitis in up to 20% of people as result of prolonged contact with coins or jewelry. Industrial processing with highly toxic nickel carbonyl can cause acute poisoning; inhalation of nickel and nickel compounds in these settings can cause respiratory tract cancer.

Chromium, arsenic, cadmium, mercury, and lead have a strong affinity for sulfur; in the human body they usually bind, via thiol groups (–SH), to enzymes responsible for controlling the speed of metabolic reactions. The resulting sulfur-metal bonds inhibit the proper functioning of the enzymes involved; human health deteriorates, sometimes fatally.

== Essential metals with potential toxicity ==
Elements that are nutritionally essential for animal or plant life but which are considered toxic metals in high doses or other forms include:

- Cobalt (Co) is a rare, essential trace element needed by adults at the level of 0.1 μg per day as part of vitamin B12. Levels above 10 mg per day can cause severe cardiomyopathies.
- Copper (Cu) is essential for human health and copper toxicity is rare and occurs primarily in inherited diseases of the liver.
- Iron (Fe) is required for hemoglobin in red blood cells. Large excesses of iron from dietary supplements, on the order of 0.5 g, can cause acute iron poisoning.
- Magnesium (Mg), important for many types of reactions in cells, rarely poses a hazard unless ingested by people with severe renal failure or as metal fume fever from magnesium oxide.
- Manganese (Mn) inhalation during mining causes manganese poisoning.
- Molybdenum (Mo) is an essential element with low toxicity. Its toxicity resembles copper deficiency and treatment with copper reduces the toxic effects of molybdenum.
- Selenium (Se) is a required nutrient to form selenoproteins; inadequate amounts lead to Keshan disease. Excess selenium causes Selenosis. However the element itself has low solubility and the biologically active forms are ions +6, +4, and +2.
- Zinc (Zn) has a Recommended dietary allowance of 15 mg and is only toxic at ten times that amount. Zinc toxicity is rare. Free zinc ion in solution is highly toxic to bacteria, plants, invertebrates, and fish. Metal fume fever occurs when zinc oxide (ZnO) is inhaled by welders working on galvanized steel or brass.

Dietary deficits of some metals, including calcium (Ca), zinc, iron, selenium, copper, chromium and manganese increase toxic effects of metals.

== Toxicities from nonessential metals ==
The metals aluminum (Al), Bismuth (Bi), Gallium (Ga), Gold (Au), Lithium (Li), and Platinum (Pt) are used in medicine but can be toxic in some circumstances.

- Lithium toxicity arises from overdose of lithium-containing drugs.
- Platinosis, a serious allergic reaction causing dermatitis and respiratory distress, have been reported as a side effect of wearing platinum jewelry, but usually results from previous industrial exposure to platinum dust or compounds like sodium chloroplatinate.

== Minor toxic metals ==
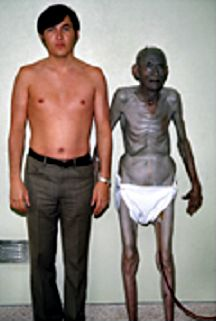
A 92-year-old Caucasian man (right) with pigmentary changes had used nose drops containing silver for many years. His skin biopsy showed silver deposits in the dermis, confirming the diagnosis of generalized argyria.

- Baritosis, a benign pneumoconiosis is associated with inhalation of dust containing barium sulfate or barium carbonate; the effects are reversible.
- Silver poisoning, like lithium poisoning, arises from misapplication of medications. A dramatic symptom of "argyria" is that the skin turns blue or bluish-grey.
- Thallium poisoning has been observed on several occasions, and it is well known that thallium compounds are highly toxic. Nonetheless, incidents of thallium poisoning are few.
- Tin poisoning from tin metal, its oxides, and its salts are "almost unknown"; on the other hand certain organotin compounds are almost as toxic as cyanide. Such organotin compounds were once widely used as anti-fouling agents.

== Treatment for poisoning ==
=== Diagnosis ===
It is difficult to differentiate the effects of low level metal poisoning from the environment with other kinds of environmental harms, including nonmetal pollution. Generally, increased exposure to heavy metals in the environment increases the risks for several diseases.

=== Chelation therapy ===
A metal EDTA anion. Pb displaces Ca in Na_{2}[CaEDTA] to give Na_{2}[PbEDTA], which is passed out of the body in urine.

Chelation therapy is a medical procedure that involves the administration of chelating agents to remove or deactivate heavy metals from the body. Chelating agents are molecules that form particularly stable coordination complexes with metal ions. Complexation prevents the metal ions from reacting with molecules in the body, and enable them to be dissolved in blood and eliminated in urine.

== Environmental remediation ==
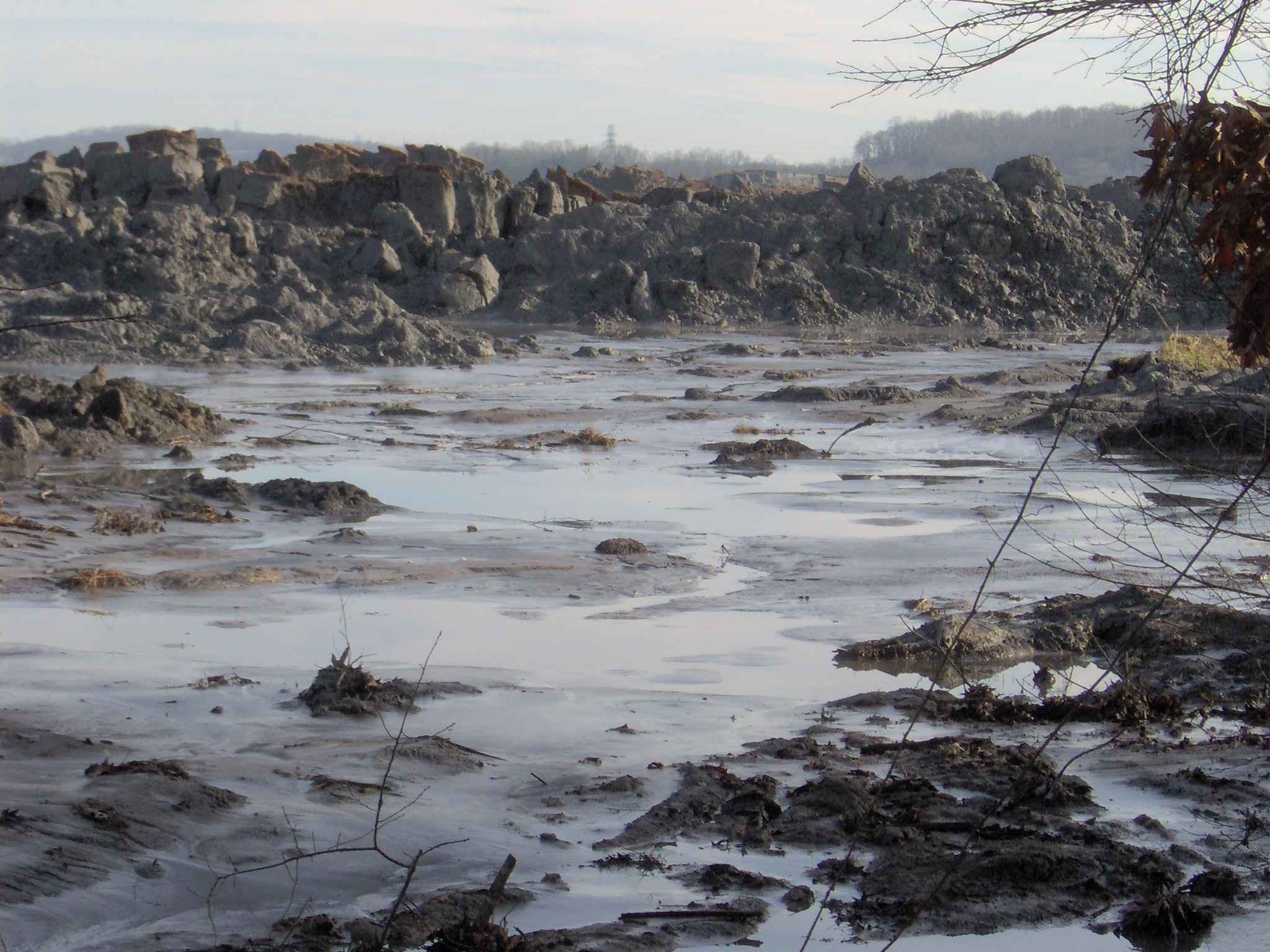
A 25-foot (7.6 m) wall of coal fly ash from the release of 5.4 million cubic yards ash slurry into the Emory River, Tennessee, in 2008.The river water was contaminated with toxic metals including arsenic, copper, barium, cadmium, chromium, lead, mercury, nickel, and thallium. Cleanup costs may exceed $1.2 billion.

Soils contaminated by heavy metals can be remediated by one or more of the following technologies: isolation; immobilization; toxicity reduction; physical separation; or extraction. Isolation involves the use of caps, membranes or below-ground barriers in an attempt to quarantine the contaminated soil. Immobilization aims to alter the properties of the soil so as to hinder the mobility of the heavy contaminants. Toxicity reduction attempts to oxidise or reduce the toxic heavy metal ions, via chemical or biological means into less toxic or mobile forms.

Physical separation involves the removal of the contaminated soil and the separation of the metal contaminants by mechanical means. Extraction is an on or off-site process that uses chemicals, high-temperature volatization, or electrolysis to extract contaminants from soils. The process or processes used will vary according to contaminant and the characteristics of the site.

== History ==
Consequences from toxic metals begins prior to 2000 BCE when lead became abundant as a side effect of silver smelting. Early Greek medical texts from 370 BCE onward discussed metal poisoning, including from arsenic and mercury. However the breadth of impact began with the Industrial Revolution in the 1800s, when most of the metal elements were discovered.

The early work on metal toxicology focused on acute effects from high doses. This knowledge led to governmental oversight and changes in industrial practice such that acute effects are now rarely observed. Later evidence emerged of problems from long term exposure to lower levels of metal toxins. Toxicology as a science began in the early 1800s with the work of Mattieu Orfila and Claude Bernard. Awareness of the issues with the widespread use of arsenic on crops and even the use of lead shot in weapons. Ubiquitous and sometimes massive quantities of arsenic spread throughout England in the late 1800s before being reined in, becoming an unfortunate pattern followed by other toxic metals.

== See also ==
Bioremediation
