= Berylliosis =

- Other names: chronic beryllium disease (CBD)
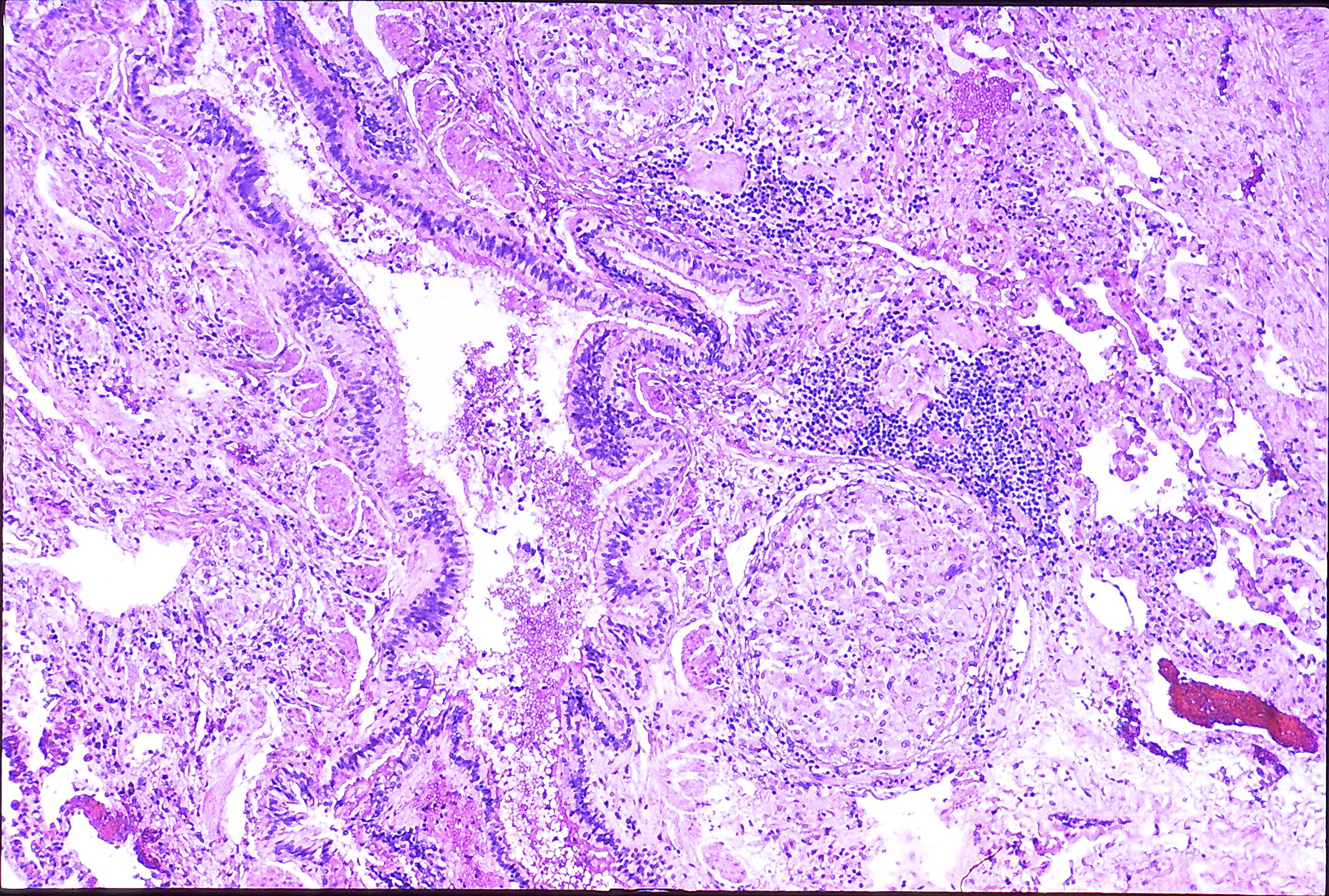
- Peribronchal non-necrotizing granuloma from berylliosis
- Specialty: Pulmonology
- Symptoms: Dry cough; fatigue; fever; unexplained weight loss; chest pain; shortness of breath; night sweats
- Complications: Respiratory failure; liver damage
- Usual onset: months to decades after initial exposure
- Duration: chronic if untreated
- Causes: inhalation of beryllium or its compounds
- Diagnostic method: based on symptoms and history; beryllium lymphocyte proliferation test
- Differential diagnosis: Sarcoidosis; tuberculosis; idiopathic pulmonary fibrosis; hypersensitivity pneumonitis; asthma
- Prevention: reducing exposure to beryllium, including workplace safety controls and personal protective equipment
- Treatment: Oxygen therapy; supportive care
- Medication: Corticosteroids
- Frequency: 1–6% of workers exposed to beryllium

Berylliosis, or chronic beryllium disease (CBD), is a chronic allergic-type lung response and chronic lung disease caused by exposure to beryllium and its compounds, a form of beryllium poisoning. It is distinct from acute beryllium poisoning, which became rare following occupational exposure limits established around 1950. Berylliosis is an occupational lung disease.

While there is no cure, symptoms can be treated.

== Signs and symptoms ==
With single or prolonged exposure by inhalation the lungs may become sensitized to beryllium. Berylliosis has a slow onset and progression. Some people who are sensitized to beryllium may not have symptoms. Continued exposure causes the development of small inflammatory nodules, called granulomas. Of note, the authors of a 2006 study suggested that beryllium inhalation was not the only form of exposure and perhaps skin exposure was also a cause, as they found that a reduction in beryllium inhalation did not result in a reduction in chronic beryllium disease or beryllium sensitization.

Granuloma formation is seen in other diseases such as tuberculosis and sarcoidosis. Sarcoidosis, like berylliosis, also produces granulomas without a necrotic core, and so distinction between the two processes can be difficult.

Ultimately, this process leads to restrictive lung disease (a decrease in diffusion capacity).

The earliest symptoms are typically cough and shortness of breath. Other symptoms include chest pain, joint aches, weight loss, and fever.

Rarely, one can get granulomas in other organs including the liver.

The onset of symptoms can range from weeks up to tens of years from the initial exposure. In some individuals, a single exposure to beryllium can cause berylliosis.

== Pathogenesis ==
In susceptible persons, beryllium exposure can lead to a cell-mediated immune response. The T-cells become sensitized to beryllium. Each subsequent exposure leads to an immune response involving CD4+ helper T-lymphocytes and macrophages accumulating in the lungs. As this response continues macrophages, CD4+ T-lymphocytes and plasma cells aggregate together to form the noncaseating granulomas. When beryllium is phagocytized by macrophages, the beryllium triggers macrophage apoptosis, thereby reducing beryllium clearance from the lungs and eventually resulting in secondary necrosis and lysis. Eventually, the outcome is fibrosis of the lung.

Several studies have shown that there is a genetic component to beryllium sensitivity. Specifically, those beryllium-exposed workers with a mutation at the HLA-DPB1 Glu^{69} position have increased prevalence of beryllium sensitization and chronic beryllium disease. The HLA-DPB1 gene is important for MHC class II molecule function on antigen presenting cells. A study of the immune response to beryllium in individuals who express the HLA-DP2 allele found that CD4 T-cells do not detect the Be^{2+} cation itself, but instead detect surface changes in the HLA-DP2/peptide complex in which Be^{2+} is embedded. Those researchers concluded that chronic beryllium disease is a predisposition that lies between "allergic hypersensitivity and autoimmunity."

According to the International Agency for Research on Cancer, beryllium and beryllium compounds are Category 1 carcinogens; they are carcinogenic to both animals and humans.

== Diagnosis ==
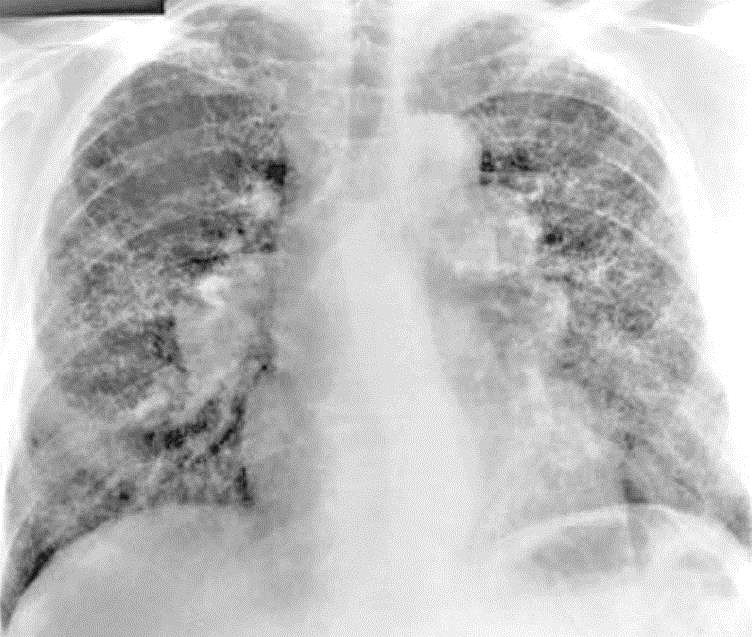
X-ray image of a 54-year-old man working in the aerospace manufacturing industry with berylliosis

The differential diagnosis for berylliosis includes:

- Sarcoidosis
- Granulomatous lung diseases
  - Tuberculosis
  - Fungal infections (e.g., histoplasmosis)
  - Granulomatosis with polyangiitis
- Idiopathic pulmonary fibrosis
- Hypersensitivity pneumonitis
- Asthma

Diagnosis of berylliosis is based on history of beryllium exposures, documented beryllium sensitivity, and granulomatous inflammation on lung biopsy. Given the invasive nature of a lung biopsy, diagnosis can also be based on clinical history consistent with berylliosis, abnormal chest x-ray or CT scan findings, and abnormalities in pulmonary function tests.

The radiologic and pathologic features of berylliosis are very similar to sarcoidosis. Due to the strong clinical and histopathological resemblance of sarcoidosis and berylliosis, patients are sometimes misdiagnosed with sarcoidosis until the history of exposure to beryllium is elicited and beryllium hypersensitivity demonstrated with specific testing. Some studies suggest that up to 6% of all cases of sarcoidosis are actually berylliosis.

The beryllium lymphocyte proliferation test (BeLPT) is the standard way of determining sensitivity to beryllium. The test is performed by acquiring either peripheral blood or fluid from a bronchial alveolar lavage, and lymphocytes are cultured with beryllium sulfate. Cells are then counted and those with elevated number of cells are considered abnormal. Those exposed persons with two abnormal BeLPT tested with peripheral blood, or one abnormal and one borderline result, are considered beryllium sensitized. Also, those with one abnormal BeLPT tested with fluid from a bronchial alveolar lavage are considered sensitized.

Chest radiography findings of berylliosis are non-specific. Early in the disease radiography findings are usually normal. In later stages interstitial fibrosis, pleural irregularities, hilar lymphadenopathy and ground-glass opacities have been reported. Findings on CT are also not specific to berylliosis. Findings that are common in CT scans of people with berylliosis include parenchymal nodules in early stages. One study found that ground-glass opacities were more commonly seen on CT scan in berylliosis than in sarcoidosis. In later stages hilar lymphadenopathy, interstitial pulmonary fibrosis and pleural thickening.

=== Classification ===
Berylliosis is an occupational disease. Relevant occupations are those where beryllium is mined, processed or converted into metal alloys, or where machining of metals containing beryllium and recycling of scrap alloys occurs. It is associated with aerospace manufacturing, microwave semiconductor electronics, beryllium mining or manufacturing of fluorescent light bulbs (which once contained beryllium compounds in their internal phosphor coating). Beryllia was used in lamp manufacture because of ceramic's obvious virtues for insulation and heat resistance, and also because beryllia could be made transparent. Certain welding anodes along with other electrical contacts and even non-sparking tools are made of beryllium copper alloy and the subsequent machining of such materials would cause the disease as well. Copper Titanium Non Sparking tools were developed as safe alternative to protect users from Berylliosis disease.

== Prevention ==
Because it can be difficult to control industrial exposures to beryllium, it is advisable to use any methods possible to reduce airborne and surface contamination by beryllium, to minimize the use of beryllium and beryllium-containing alloys whenever possible, and to educate people about the potential hazards if they are likely to encounter beryllium dust or fumes. It is important to damp wipe metallographic preparation equipment to prevent accumulation of dry particles. Sectioning, grinding, and polishing must be performed under sufficiently vented hoods equipped with special filters.

On 29 January 2009, the Los Alamos National Laboratory announced it was notifying nearly 2,000 current and former employees and visitors that they may have been exposed to beryllium in the lab and may be at risk of disease. Concern over possible exposure to the material was first raised in November 2008, when a box containing beryllium was received at the laboratory's short-term storage facility.

== Treatment ==
There is no cure for berylliosis; the goals of treatment are to reduce symptoms and slow the progression of disease.

Although the evidence that stopping exposure to beryllium decreases progression of the disease is limited, it is still considered to be an accepted approach to treatment in any stage of disease.

People with early stages of disease, without lung function abnormalities or clinical symptoms, are periodically monitored with physical exams, pulmonary function testing and radiography.

Once clinical symptoms or significant abnormalities in pulmonary function testing appear, treatments include oxygen and oral corticosteroids and whatever supportive therapy is required.

== Outcomes ==
Overall mortality rates are 5–38%.

== Epidemiology ==
The number of workers in the United States exposed to beryllium vary but has been estimated to be as high as 800,000 during the 1960s and 1970s. A more recent study from 2004 estimated the number of exposed workers in the United States to be around 134,000.

The rate of workers becoming sensitized to beryllium varies based on genetics and exposure levels. In one study researchers found the prevalence of beryllium sensitization to range from 9–19% depending on the industry. Many workers who are found to be sensitive to beryllium also meet the diagnostic criteria for chronic beryllium disease. In one study of nuclear workers, among those who were sensitized to beryllium, 66% were found to have chronic beryllium disease as well. The rate of progression from beryllium sensitization to chronic beryllium disease has been estimated to be approximately 6–8% per year. Stopping exposure to beryllium in those sensitized has not been definitively shown to stop the progression to chronic beryllium disease.

The overall prevalence of chronic beryllium disease among workers exposed to beryllium has ranged from 1–5% depending on industry and time period of study.

The general population is unlikely to develop acute or chronic beryllium disease because ambient air levels of beryllium are normally very low (<0.03 ng/m^{3}). However, a study found 1% of people living within 3/4 of a mile of a beryllium plant in Lorain, Ohio, had berylliosis after exposure to concentrations estimated to be less than 1 milligram per cubic metre of air. In the United States the Beryllium Case Registry contained 900 records, early cases relating to extraction and fluorescent lamp manufacture, later ones coming from the aerospace, ceramics and metallurgical industries.

== History ==
Since the 1920s, beryllium has been used in electronics, ceramics, research and development labs, aircraft, and the atomic energy and defense industry. Cases of bronchitis and pneumonia-like symptoms were reported in Germany and Russia in the 1930s among workers mining and refining beryllium. By 1946, a cluster of cases associated with fluorescent lamp manufacturers were apparent in the United States, and the lamp industry stopped using beryllium in 1949. At that time, most construction trades and industries were unaware of the potential risks associated with beryllium exposure.

It occasionally killed early workers in nuclear weapons design, such as Herbert L. Anderson. The physicist W. W. Hansen who was instrumental in the development of the klystron also died of the disease in 1949.

Beryllium sensitivity testing was first performed as a cutaneous beryllium patch test in the early 1950s, but was discontinued due to the test stimulating sensitization or aggravating existing chronic beryllium disease.

In the 1990s, the DOE began screening employees using the BeLPT test in facilities where beryllium was used, to take preventive measures against beryllium exposure. Somewhat alarmingly, clerical staff who were never involved in handling the material had developed asymptomatic sensitivities.

== In fiction ==
The science fiction novella Sucker Bait by Isaac Asimov centres on a planet on which the first settlers all died of berylliosis, due to high concentration of beryllium in the planet's crust.
