= Beryllium poisoning =

Beryllium poisoning is poisoning by the toxic effects of beryllium, or more usually its compounds. It takes two forms:

- Acute beryllium poisoning, usually as a result of exposure to soluble beryllium salts
- Chronic beryllium disease (CBD) or berylliosis, usually as a result of long-term exposure to beryllium oxide usually caused by inhalation.
