= Methylorubrum extorquens =

Scientific classification
- Domain: Bacteria
- Kingdom: Pseudomonadati
- Phylum: Pseudomonadota
- Class: Alphaproteobacteria
- Order: Hyphomicrobiales
- Family: Methylobacteriaceae
- Genus: Methylorubrum
- Species: M. extorquens

Binomial name
- Methylorubrum extorquens (Urakami and Komagata 1984) Green and Ardley 2018

Synonyms
- Bacillus extorquens Bassalik 1913; Vibrio extorquens (Bassalik 1913) Bhat and Barker 1948; Pseudomonas extorquens (Bassalik 1913) Krasil'nikov 1949; Flavobacterium extorquens (Bassalik 1913) Bassalik et al. 1960; Protomonas extorquens (ex Bassalik 1913) Urakami and Komagata 1984; Methylobacterium chloromethanicum McDonald et al. 2001; Methylobacterium dichloromethanicum Doronina et al. 2000; Methylobacterium extorquens (Urakami and Komagata 1984) Bousfield and Green 1985; Methylobacterium dichloromethanicum subsp. chloromethanicum (McDonald et al. 2001) Hördt et al. 2020

Species of bacterium

Methylorubrum extorquens (Methylobacterium extorquens, see below) is a species of Gram-negative bacterium from the family Methylobacteriaceae. Methylorubrum species often appear pink, and are classified as pink-pigmented facultative methylotrophs, or PPFMs. The wild type has been known to use both methane and multiple carbon compounds as energy sources. Specifically, M. extorquens has been observed to use primarily methanol and C_{1} compounds as substrates in their energy cycles. It has been also observed to use lanthanides as a cofactor to increase its methanol dehydrogenase activity

== Nomenclature ==
As described on the Methylobacterium page, M. extorquens and all other Methylorubrum have been reclassified as Methylobacterium. This reclassification was based upon phylogenomics, gene content, synteny, and lack of distinguishing phenotypes.

== Genetic structure ==
After isolation from soil, M. extorquens TK 001 was found to have a single chromosome measuring 5.71-Mb. The bacterium itself contains 70 genes over eight regions of the chromosome that are used for its metabolism of methanol.

M. extorquens AM1 contains two xoxF genes that enable it to grow on methanol with lanthanides as a cofactor. On the other hand, the mxa gene cluster encodes the classical calcium-dependent methanol dehydrogenase.

M. extorquens AM1 genome encodes a 47.5 kb gene of unknown function. This gene encodes an over 15,000 residue-long polypeptide along with three unique compounds that are not expressed.

== Chemical use ==
Methylorubrum extorquens uses primarily C_{1} and C_{2} compounds to grow. Utilizing compounds with few carbon-carbon bonds allows the bacterium to successfully grow in environments with methanol, such as on the surface of leaves whose stomata emit methanol. The ability to use methanol as both a carbon and energy source was show to be advantageous when colonizing Medicago truncatula.

H_{4}MPT-dependent formaldehyde oxidation was first isolated in M. extroquens AM1 and has been used to define if an organism is utilizing methylotrophic metabolism.

== Relationships with other organisms ==
Many bacteria within the family Methylobacteriaceae live in different biotic environments such as soils, dust, and plant leaves. Some of these bacteria have been found in symbiotic relationships with the plants they inhabit in which they provide fixed nitrogen or produce vitamin B_{12}. M. extorquens also produces PhyR which plants use to regulate stress response, allowing the plant to survive in different conditions. In addition to PhyR, the bacterium can produce a hormone related to overall plant and root growth.

M. extorquens has been found to have a mutualistic relationship with strawberries. Ultimately, M. extorquens is used to oxidize 1,2-propanediol to lactaldehyde, which is later used in chemical reactions. If introduced to blooming plants, furaneol production increases, changing the way the strawberry tastes.

== Pathogenesis ==
Methylobacterium extorquens is considered to have low virulence properties in humans. The species is occasionally isolated from sterile body sites and attributed to healthcare associated infections.

== See also ==
- Methylacidiphilum fumariolicum
- Methylobacterium radiotolerans
