= Methylobacterium radiotolerans =

Scientific classification
- Domain: Bacteria
- Kingdom: Pseudomonadati
- Phylum: Pseudomonadota
- Class: Alphaproteobacteria
- Order: Hyphomicrobiales
- Family: Methylobacteriaceae
- Genus: Methylobacterium
- Species: M. radiotolerans

Binomial name
- Methylobacterium radiotolerans corrig. (Ito and Iizuka 1971) Green and Bousfield 1983

Synonyms
- Pseudomonas radiora Ito and Iizuka 1971 (Approved Lists 1980); Methylobacterium radiora (Ito and Iizuka 1971) Green and Bousfield 1983

Species of bacterium

Methylobacterium radiotolerans is a species of radiation-tolerating Gram-negative bacteria. It has been shown that it can use lanthanide as a cofactor to increase its methanol dehydrogenase activity

== See also ==
- Methylacidiphilum fumariolicum
- Methylorubrum extorquens
