= Delftia deserti =

Scientific classification
- Domain: Bacteria
- Kingdom: Pseudomonadati
- Phylum: Pseudomonadota
- Class: Betaproteobacteria
- Order: Burkholderiales
- Family: Comamonadaceae
- Genus: Delftia
- Species: D. deserti

Binomial name
- Delftia deserti Li et al. 2015

Type strain
- YIMY792

Species of bacterium

Delftia deserti is a Gram-negative, short rod-shaped, motile bacterium from the genus Delftia, which has been isolated from desert soil in Turpan in China. D. deserti is of the Betaproteobacteria lineage within the Comamonadaceae family.

== Biology and biochemistry ==
D. deserti cells are short rods and motile by means of one or two polar flagella. Cells are 1.06 ± 0.43 μm long and 0.75 ± 0.12 μm wide.

This bacterium has been cultured on TSA. It grows at temperatures 20-45 °C, optimally at 30 °C. Growth occurs at pH 6-9 (optimally at pH 7), and in 0–3.0% NaCl. D. deserti is fermentative, and positive for DNase activity and nitrate reduction. It can hydrolyse starch, cellulose, casein, extracellular peptidoglycan, chitin, urea, esculin, and gelatin. D. deserti is an obligate aerobe.

No infections caused by D. deserti have been reported.
