= Acute beryllium poisoning =

- Beryllium
- Specialty: Occupational medicine
- Prognosis: usually resolves in several weeks to months about 15-20% of cases progress to berylliosis

Acute beryllium poisoning is acute chemical pneumonitis resulting from the toxic effect of beryllium in its elemental form or in various chemical compounds, and is distinct from berylliosis (also called chronic beryllium disease). After occupational safety procedures were put into place following the realization that the metal caused berylliosis around 1950, acute beryllium poisoning became extremely rare.

== Signs and symptoms ==
Generally associated with exposure to beryllium levels at or above 100 μg/m^{3}, it produces severe cough, sore nose and throat, weight loss, labored breathing, anorexia, and increased fatigue.

In addition to beryllium's toxicity when inhaled, when brought into contact with skin at relatively low doses, beryllium can cause local irritation and contact dermatitis, and contact with skin that has been scraped or cut may cause rashes or ulcers. Beryllium dust or powder can irritate the eyes.

== Risk factors ==
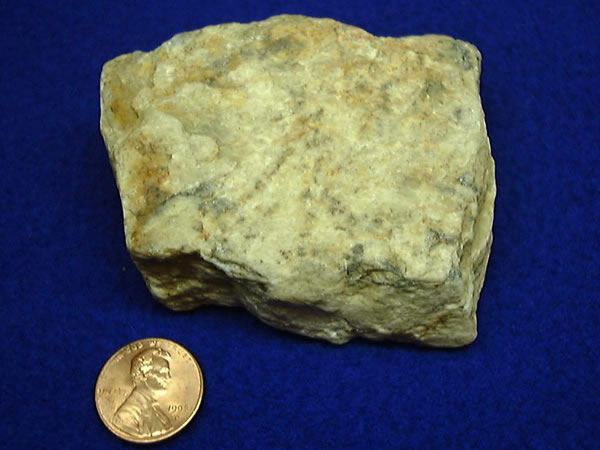
Beryllium ore

Acute beryllium poisoning is an occupational disease. Relevant occupations are those where beryllium is mined, processed or converted into metal alloys, or where machining of metals containing beryllium or recycling of scrap alloys occurs.

Metallographic preparation equipment and laboratory work surfaces must be damp-wiped occasionally to inhibit buildup of particles. Cutting, grinding, and polishing procedures that generate dust or fumes must be handled within sufficiently vented coverings supplied with particulate filters.

== Management ==
Therapy is supportive and includes removal from further beryllium exposure. For very severe cases mechanical ventilation may be required.

== Prognosis ==
The signs and symptoms of acute beryllium pneumonitis usually resolve over several weeks to months, but is statistically fatal in 10 percent of cases, and about 15–20% of cases may progress to chronic beryllium disease.

Acute beryllium poisoning approximately doubles the risk of lung cancer. The mechanism by which beryllium is carcinogenic is unclear, but may be due to ionic beryllium binding to nucleic acids; it is not mutagenic.

== History ==
Acute beryllium disease was first reported in Europe in 1933 and in the United States in 1943.
