= Platinosis =

Platinosis is an allergy-like reaction to exposure to soluble salts of platinum, platinum dust, or in some reported cases, platinum jewelry. Platinosis is usually associated with workers in industries related to platinum production. The symptoms of platinosis may include dermatitis and respiratory distress and they persist for years. The symptoms are progressive, sometimes taking months to years to appear.

Platinum metal is largely biologically inert, but halogeno-platinum compounds are among the most potent respiratory and skin sensitisers known, therefore it is vital that exposure via the skin and by breathing contaminated air is carefully controlled.

In practice, the compounds mainly responsible for platinum sensitisation are typically the soluble, ionic, platinum-chloro compounds such as ammonium hexachloroplatinate and tetrachloroplatinate, and hexachloroplatinic acid. Other ionic halogeno compounds are also sensitisers, the order of allergenicity being Cl > Br > I.

Neutral compounds such as cis-platin and ammine and nitro complexes such as [Pt(NH_{3})_{4}]Cl_{2}, K_{2}[Pt(NO_{2})_{4}] and platinum nitrate are not considered to be allergenic; neither is the metal.

== See also ==
Metal toxicity
