= Hyperchloremia =

- Chlorine
- Specialty: Endocrinology

Hyperchloremia is an electrolyte disturbance in which there is an elevated level of chloride ions in the blood. The normal serum range for chloride is 96 to 106 mEq/L, therefore chloride levels at or above 110 mEq/L usually indicate kidney dysfunction as it is a regulator of chloride concentration. As of now there are no known specific symptoms of hyperchloremia; however, it can be influenced by multiple abnormalities that cause a loss of electrolyte-free fluid, loss of hypotonic fluid, or increased administration of sodium chloride. These abnormalities are caused by diarrhea, vomiting, increased sodium chloride intake, renal dysfunction, diuretic use, and diabetes. Hyperchloremia should not be mistaken for hyperchloremic metabolic acidosis as hyperchloremic metabolic acidosis is characterized by two major changes: a decrease in blood pH and bicarbonate levels, as well as an increase in blood chloride levels. Instead those with hyperchloremic metabolic acidosis are usually predisposed to hyperchloremia.

Hyperchloremia prevalence in hospital settings has been researched in the medical field since one of the major sources of treatment at hospitals is administering saline solution. Previously, animal models with elevated chloride have displayed more inflammation markers, changes in blood pressure, increased renal vasoconstriction, and less renal blood flow as well at glomerulus filtration, all of which are prompting researchers to investigate if these changes or others may exist in patients. Some studies have reported a possible relationship between increased chloride levels and death or acute kidney injury in severely ill patients that may frequent the hospital or have prolonged visits. There are other studies that have found no relationship.

== Symptoms ==
Hyperchloremia does not have many noticeable symptoms and can only be confirmed with testing, yet, the causes of hyperchloremia do have symptoms.

Symptoms of the above stated abnormalities may include:

- Dehydration - due to diarrhea, vomiting, sweating
- Hypertension - due to increased sodium chloride intake
- Cardiovascular dysfunction - due to increased sodium chloride intake
- Edema - due to influx in sodium in the body
- Weakness - due to loss of fluids
- Thirst - due to loss of fluids
- Kussmaul breathing - due to high ion concentrations, loss of fluids, or kidney failure
- High blood sugar - due to diabetes
- Hyperchloremic metabolic acidosis - due to severe diarrhea and/or kidney failure
- Respiratory alkalosis - due to renal dysfunction

== Causes ==
There are many scenarios which may results in hyperchloremia. The first instance is when there is a loss of electrolyte-free fluid. This simply means that the body is losing increased amounts of fluids that do not contain electrolytes, like chloride, resulting in high concentration of these ions in the body. This loss of fluids can be due to sweating (due to exercise or fever), skin burns, lack of adequate water intake, hyper-metabolic state, and diabetes insipidus. Losing fluids can lead to feelings of dehydration and dry mucous membrane.

The second scenario that may lead to hyperchloremia is known as loss of hypotonic fluid which can be a direct result of loss of electrolyte fluid. Normally, water in the body is moving from an area of low ion concentration to an area of high ion concentration. In this case, the water is being excreted in the urine, therefore, less water is available to dilute these areas of high ion concentration. This can be due to diuretic use, diarrhea, vomiting, burns, kidney disease, kidney failure, and renal tubular acidosis . This may also lead to feeling of dehydration.

The third scenario that may lead to hyperchloremia is an increase in sodium chloride intake. This can be due to dietary intake or intravenous fluid administration in hospital settings. This can lead to the body experiencing hypertension, edema, and cardiovascular dysfunction.

== Mechanism ==
The nephrons in the kidney are responsible for regulating the level of chloride in the blood. The general mechanism is that as filtrate fluid passes through the nephrons varying concentrations of ions will be secreted into the interstitial fluid or absorbed into the lumen. All along the nephrons are blood capillaries waiting to reabsorb ions from the interstitial fluid to circulate in the body. The amount of chloride to be released in the urine is due to the receptors lining the nephrons and the glomerulus filtration.

Normally, chloride reabsorption begins in the proximal tubule and nearly 60% of chloride is filtered here. In a person with hyperchloremia, the absorption of chloride into the interstitial fluid and subsequently into the blood capillaries is increased. This means the concentration of chloride in the filtrate is decreased, therefore, a decreased amount of chloride is being excreted as waste in the urine. In the proximal tubule chloride reabsorption occurs in two parts. In the 1st phase, organic solutes (such as phosphates, amino acids, glucose and anions), sodium ions, and hydronium ions are reabsorbed from the filtrate fluid into the interstitial fluid. This is an important step because this creates the concentration gradient in which chloride concentration in the lumen will increase in comparison to the chloride concentration in the interstitial fluid. In phase 2, chloride will diffuse along the concentration gradient, which means chloride ions will travel from areas of high concentration to areas of low concentration.

One suggested mechanism leading to hyperchloremia, there is a decrease in chloride transporter proteins along the nephron. These proteins may include sodium-potassium-2 chloride co-transporter, chloride anion exchangers, and chloride channels. Another suggested mechanism is a depletion in concentration gradient as a result of the reduced activity in these transporters. Such concentration gradient depletion would allow for the passive diffusion of chloride in and out the tubule.

== Diagnosis ==
Elevated levels of chloride in the blood can be tested simply by requesting a serum chloride test. A doctor would request this test if there are signs their patient is experiencing an imbalance in acid-base levels for a prolonged period of time. For the test to occur a healthcare provider must draw a sample of blood from the patient. The sample will then be sent to a laboratory and results will be provided to the patient's physician. As mentioned earlier a normal serum chloride range is from 96 to 106 mEq/L, and hyperchloremic patients will have levels above this range.

== Treatment ==
As with most types of electrolyte imbalance, the treatment of high blood chloride levels is based on correcting the underlying cause.

- If the patient is dehydrated, therapy consists of establishing and maintaining adequate hydration such as drinking 2-3 quarts of water daily. Also, to alleviate symptoms of dehydration like diarrhea or vomiting, it is suggested to take medication.
- If the condition is caused or exacerbated by medications or treatments, these may be altered or discontinued, if deemed prudent.
- If there is underlying kidney disease (which is likely if there are other electrolyte disturbances), then the patient will be referred to a nephrologist for further care.
- If there is an underlying dysfunction of the endocrine or hormone system, the patient will likely be referred to an endocrinologist for further assessment.
- If the electrolyte imbalance is due to influx of sodium chloride in the body, then it has been suggested to make dietary changes or reduce the rate of administering intravenous fluids.

== Recent research ==
In patients with sepsis or septic shock they are more susceptible to experience acute kidney injury (AKI) and the factors that may contribute to AKI are still being investigated. In a study conducted by Suetrong et al., (2016) using patients admitted to St. Paul Hospital in Vancouver with sepsis or septic shock had their body concentration of chloride checked over the course of 48 hours to determine if there is a relation between hyperchloremia and AKI. This is an important relationship to study because many times a form of therapy to treat sepsis and septic shock is to administer saline solution, which is a solution containing sodium chloride. Saline has a much higher concentration of chloride than does blood. In this study they defined hyperchloremia as concentration of chloride greater than 110 mmol/L. This research demonstrated that hyperchloremia will influence a patient developing AKI. In fact, even patients that had a conservative increase in serum chloride saw some association with developing AKI. This research study suggest that there still needs to be more investigation in the risk of using saline as a form of therapy and the risk of experiencing AKI.

In a separate study investigating the relation of critically ill patients and hyperchloremia, researchers found that there seems to be an independent association between ill patients with hyperchloremia and mortality. This study was conducted with septic patients admitted to ICUs for 72 hours. Chloride levels were assessed at baseline and 72 hours, and confounding variables were accounted for. This study is important because this continues to suggest there is increased risk associated with elevated chloride levels in vulnerable populations. Their article also states there needs to be avoidance of using solutions with chloride in specific patient subgroups

Several trials have been done comparing balanced fluid (chloride restricted) solution with saline (chloride liberal) with the hypothesis that it may reduce the risk of AKI and mortality. Initial randomized trials in septic shock comparing Plasma-Lyte and 0.9% saline (SPLIT and SALT trials) did not show any risk reduction in AKI. However, the later trials with larger sample size in critically and non critically ill adults (SMART and SALT-ED trials) showed reduction in major adverse kidney events. Extrapolating from the findings of septic shock, a recent trial comparing plasmalyte with 0.9% saline in DKA also did not show any significant difference in AKI. Hence, the causal link between hyperchloremia and AKI is yet to be conclusively established.

As studies continue, it is important to include a large patient sample size, a diverse patient population, and a diverse range of hospitals involved in these studies.
