= Delftia acidovorans =

Scientific classification
- Domain: Bacteria
- Kingdom: Pseudomonadati
- Phylum: Pseudomonadota
- Class: Betaproteobacteria
- Order: Burkholderiales
- Family: Comamonadaceae
- Genus: Delftia
- Species: D. acidovorans

Binomial name
- Delftia acidovorans (den Dooren de Jong 1926); Wen et al. 1999

Type strain
- ATCC 15668T

Synonyms
- Comamonas acidovorans (den Dooren de Jong 1926) Tamaoka et al. 1987; Pseudomonas indoloxidans Gray 1928; Pseudomonas desmolytica Gray and Thornton 1928; Pseudomonas acidovorans den Dooren de Jong 1926

Species of bacterium

Delftia acidovorans is a Gram-negative, motile, non-sporulating, rod-shaped bacterium known for its ability to biomineralize gold and bioremediation characteristics. It was first isolated from soil in Delft, Netherlands. The bacterium was originally categorized as Pseudomonas acidovorans and Comamonas acidovorans before being reclassified as Delftia acidovorans.

== History ==
Delftia acidovorans was originally known as Comamonas acidovorans. It was renamed due to rRNA relatedness and differences from other microbes within the Comamonadaceae family. These differences are evidenced by phylogenetic and phenotypic data. The new name, Delftia acidovorans, is a reference to the city of Delft, where it was first discovered and recorded.

== Biology and biochemistry ==
=== Type and morphology ===
Delftia acidovorans is a saprophyte, Gram-negative, non-sporulating, non-denitrifying, non-fermentative rod shaped bacterium. It exists as a single cell or in pairs that are 0.4-0.8 μm wide and 2.5-4.1 μm long. It is motile through polar, or bipolar, tufts of flagella. Tufts can have one to five flagella.

=== Strains and phylogeny ===
Delftia acidovorans exists as part of the Betaproteobacteria lineage within the Comamonadaceae family. D. acidovorans strains SPH1, ATCC 1 15668, and Cs 1-4 are closely related. While strains CCUG 247B and CCUG 15835 belong to Delftia acidovorans, they are more similar to Delftia tsuruhatensis. CCUG 247B and CCUG 15835 are often grouped with D. tsuruhatensis rather than D. acidovorans.

=== Metabolism ===
Delftia acidovorans is mesophilic and its optimal growing temperature is 30 °C. It will not survive in psychrophilic conditions. D. acidovorans is a non-halophile that prefers environments with minimal to no salt concentrations for growth. D. acidovorans strains Cs1-4 and SPH-1 are aerobic bacteria.

Delftia acidovorans strains Cs1-4 and SPH-1 can use phenanthrene, pyruvate, vanillate, succinate, formic acid, gluconic acid, hydroxybutyric acid, lactic acid, and propionic acid as carbon sources. D. acidovorans does not produce urease, is catalase and oxidase positive, and oxidizes fructose and mannitol.

=== Biomineralization ===
Delftia acidovorans is one of the few bacteria, along with Cupriavidus metallidurans, that can metabolize gold. Au^{3+} is reduced extracellularly by the non-ribosomal secondary metabolite delftibactin. Delftibactin is a unique metabolite, as it can protect the bacteria from gold toxicity as well as reduce gold ions to solid form. Delftibactin can remove gold from sludges containing seawater and calcium carbonate, and is also capable of retrieving gold from electronic waste. Biohydrometallurgy techniques using D. acidovorans improve recycling profitability and are sustainable alternatives to cyanide leaching. Lead can also be recovered from discarded electronics with D. acidovorans. Attempts to induce delftibactin expression in Escherichia coli were unsuccessful due to the toxicity of the DelH protein.

=== Bioremediation and biomanufacturing ===
Delftia acidovorans is capable of converting toxic metals including selenium and chromium ions into harmless products. It can also degrade phenanthrene, which is a carbon source from polycylic aromatic hydrocarbons. Phenanthrene is a common environmental pollutant.

D. acidovorans can be used to manufacture polyhydroxyalkanoates (PHAs), a favorable alternative towards traditional plastic equipment used in medical settings. Traditional plastic manufacturing is resource-consuming and polluting, while PHA production through D. acidovorans is a more sustainable solution.

== Role in disease ==
D. acidovorans is an emergent opportunistic pathogen that demonstrates antibiotic resistance. The infection can cause bacteremia, keratitis, pneumonia, empyema, otitis, and peritonitis. Known sources of infection include contaminated water and catheters. D. acidovorans should be considered a causative organism in patients when water or soil contamination is suspected. D. acidovorans has been isolated from clinical settings as well, such as RO systems, surgical vacuums, and operating bay sinks. Some strains can tolerate chlorhexidine, a common surgical disinfectant.

Infections of D. acidovorans can be confirmed through an orange indole test. Antibiotic resistance to aminoglycosides is common.
