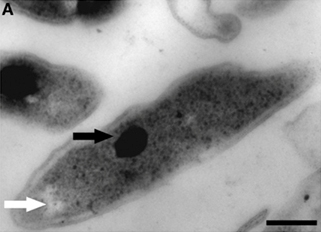
- Methylacidiphilum fumariolicum

Scientific classification (Candidatus)
- Domain: Bacteria
- Phylum: Verrucomicrobiota
- Class: incertae sedis
- Order: Methylacidiphilales
- Family: Methylacidiphilaceae
- Genus: Methylacidiphilum
- Species: M. fumariolicum

Binomial name
- Methylacidiphilum fumariolicum H. Op den Camp, et al 2007

Type strain
- SolV

= Methylacidiphilum fumariolicum =

Species of bacterium

Methylacidiphilum fumariolicum is an autotrophic bacterium first described in 2007 growing on volcanic pools near Naples, Italy. It grows in mud at temperatures between 50 °C and 60 °C and an acidic pH of 2–5. It is able to oxidize methane gas. It uses ammonium, nitrate or atmospheric nitrogen as a nitrogen source and fixes carbon dioxide.

Due to the presence of a lanthanide dependent methanol dehydrogenase enzyme, its growth is strictly dependent on the abundance of rare-earth metals.

No biotic interactions between M. fumariolicum and other organisms are known, probably due to the extreme environment the bacteria needs in order to grow.

== Biology ==
=== Genome ===
The genome of M. fumariolicum is 2.36 Mbp in size with a GC-content of 40.9% and 2,283 protein encoding genes.

=== Metabolism ===
Energy is obtained by methane oxidation to methanol and by the enzyme methanol dehydrogenase which is strictly dependent on the use of rare-earth metals as cofactors. It generally uses lanthanum as an essential cofactor but it has been shown that it can be replaced with other lanthanides such as cerium, praseodymium, or neodymium without negative effects and with samarium, europium, or gadolinium only slowing down the growth speed of the bacteria.

It uses the Calvin Benson Bassham cycle to fixate carbon dioxide and use it as a carbon source. In fact concentrations of CO_{2} below 0.3% (v/v) impairs any growth of M. fumariolicum.

M. fumariolicum was found to be more oxygen sensitive than most Pseudomonadota methanotrophs, probably due to the fact that it uses nitrogenase during nitrogen fixation which is known to be oxygen sensitive.

== See also ==
- Methylobacterium radiotolerans
- Methylorubrum extorquens
