= Cupriavidus metallidurans =

Scientific classification
- Domain: Bacteria
- Kingdom: Pseudomonadati
- Phylum: Pseudomonadota
- Class: Betaproteobacteria
- Order: Burkholderiales
- Family: Burkholderiaceae
- Genus: Cupriavidus
- Species: C. metallidurans

Binomial name
- Cupriavidus metallidurans (Goris et al. 2001) Vandamme and Coenye 2004

Type strain
- ATCC 43123, aka CH34

Synonyms
- Ralstonia metallidurans Goris et al. 2001; Wautersia metallidurans (Goris et al. 2001) Vaneechoutte et al. 2004; (Not distinguished from Ralstonia eutropha until 2001.)

Species of bacterium

Cupriavidus metallidurans is a non-spore-forming, Gram-negative bacterium which is adapted to survive several forms of heavy metal stress.

== As a model and industrial system ==
Cupriavidus metallidurans is a bacterial species that belongs to the same family as Ralstonia solanacearum, a plant pathogen.

This species is of ecological and industrial importance, as its relatives dominate mesophilic environments contaminated with heavy metals. C. metallidurans is used in the industrial sector for both heavy metal remediation and sensing.

This aerobic chemolithoautotroph is capable of growing in a mineral salts environment with H_{2}, O_{2}, and CO_{2} without an organic carbon source. Its energy-providing subsystem is composed of only the hydrogenase, the respiratory chain, and the F1F0-ATPase, which remain separate from the anabolic subsystems.

C. metallidurans can also degrade xenobiotics in conditions with high levels of heavy metals.

Strain CH34 has adapted to these harsh conditions through multiple heavy-metal resistance systems, encoded by the two indigenous megaplasmids, pMOL28 and pMOL30, on its chromosome(s).

== Ecology ==
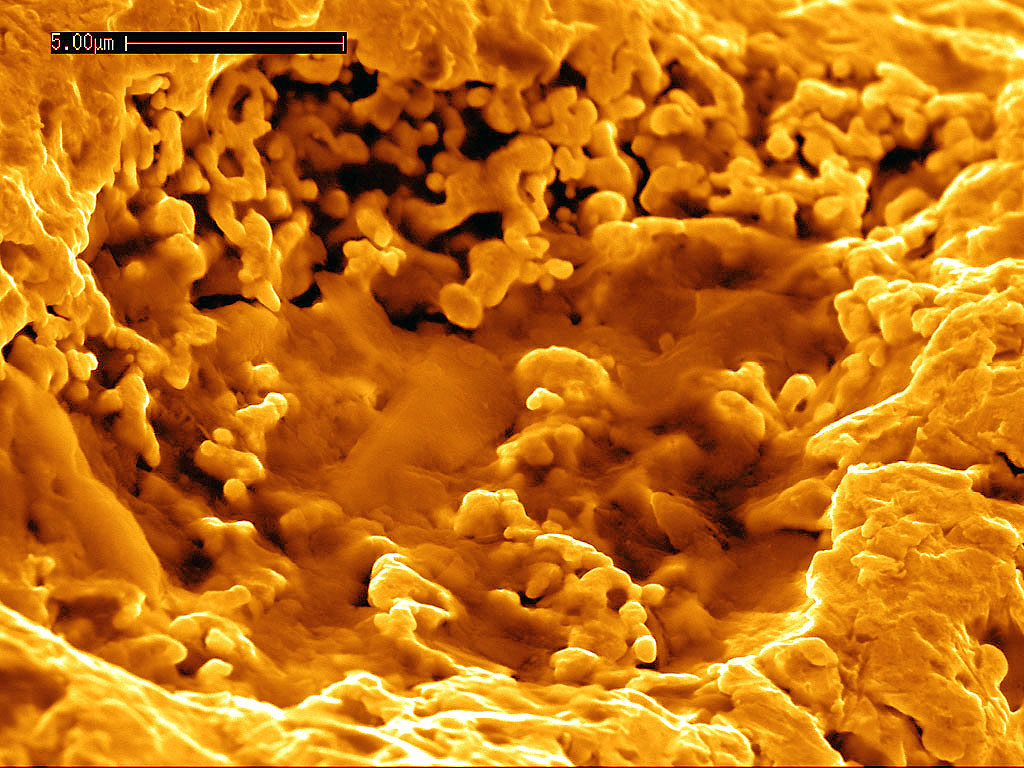
A scanning electron microscope image of a gold nugget, revealing bacterioform (bacteria-shaped) structures

C. metallidurans plays a vital role, together with Delftia acidovorans, in the formation of gold nuggets. It precipitates metallic gold from a solution of gold(III) chloride, a compound highly toxic to most other microorganisms.

== As a pathogen ==
A case of a 74 year old man infected with Cupriavidus metallidurans has been documented, possibly raising concerns about the safety of using the bacteria for industrial purposes.
