= Delftia tsuruhatensis =

Scientific classification
- Domain: Bacteria
- Kingdom: Pseudomonadati
- Phylum: Pseudomonadota
- Class: Betaproteobacteria
- Order: Burkholderiales
- Family: Comamonadaceae
- Genus: Delftia
- Species: D. tsuruhatensis

Binomial name
- Delftia tsuruhatensis Shigematsu et al. 2003, sp. nov.

Type strain
- ATCC BAA-554, DSM 17581, IFO 16741, NBRC 16741, T7

Species of bacterium

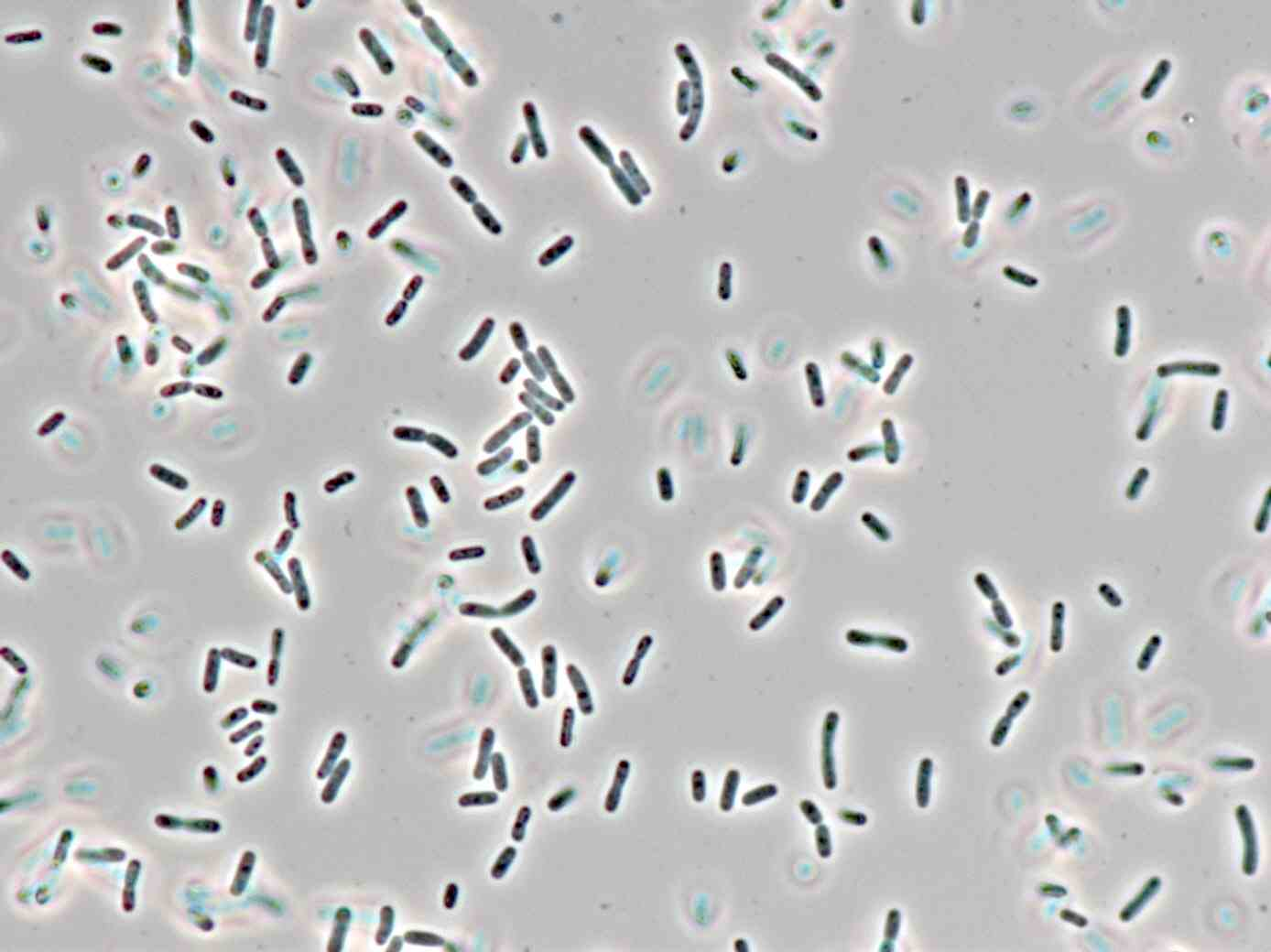

Delftia tsuruhatensis is a Gram-negative, rod-shaped, catalase- and oxidase-positive, motile bacterium from the Comamonadaceae family. D. tsuruhatensis was first isolated from a wastewater treatment plant in Japan in 2003. D. tsuruhatensis is an opportunistic and emergent pathogen. All documented human infections are healthcare-associated.

== Taxonomy ==
D. tsuruhatensis was validly published in 2003.

== Biology and biochemistry ==
Cells are slightly curved, short rod-shaped cells that occur singly or in pairs. Cells are 0.7–1.2 μm wide and 2.4–4.0 μm long.

D. tsuruhatensis can degrade phenolic compounds and aniline, which are often pollutants of soil and water.

=== Biofilm interactions ===
D. tsuruhatensis can inhibit quorum sensing and biofilm formation, which could inform new therapeutic drugs against antibiotic-resistant bacteria. D. tsuruhatensis inhibits quorum sensing and suppresses biofilm formation against Pseudomonas aeruginosa and other pathogens. These activities increase P. aeruginosa's susceptibility to antibiotics by 2 to 3 times.

== Applications ==
In 2023, researchers published evidence in Science that D. tsuruhatensis prevents the development of malaria in mosquitos by secreting harmane. Mosquitos infected by the bacteria had 75% fewer Plasmodium oocysts and featured infection rates one third those of uninfected mosquitoes.

== See also ==
- Serratia – a genus of bacteria that can be genetically modified to prevent malaria.
- Wolbachia – a genus of bacteria that can be used to control dengue.
