= Methanol dehydrogenase =

Class of enzymes

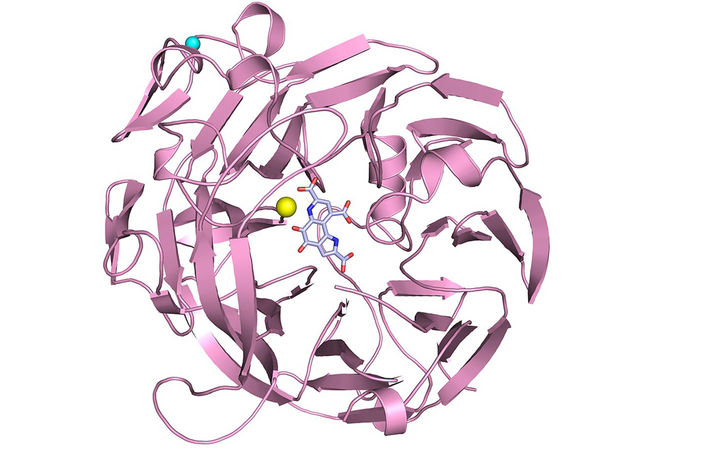
PQQ-MDH enzyme structure, with PQQ in the center. The yellow sphere represents a La^{3+} ion.

In enzymology, a methanol dehydrogenase (MDH) is an enzyme that catalyzes the chemical reaction:

CH_{3}OH $\rightleftharpoons$ CH_{2}O + 2 electrons + 2H^{+}

How the electrons are captured and transported depends upon the kind of methanol dehydrogenase. There are three main types of MDHs: NAD^{+}-dependent MDH, pyrrolo-quinoline quinone dependent MDH, and oxygen-dependent alcohol oxidase.

This enzyme belongs to the family of oxidoreductases, specifically those acting on the CH-OH group of donor with NAD^{+} or NADP^{+} as acceptor. The systematic name of this enzyme class is methanol:NAD^{+} oxidoreductase. This enzyme participates in methane metabolism.

Many alcohol dehydrogenases also oxidize methanol.

== Classes of Methanol Dehydrogenase ==
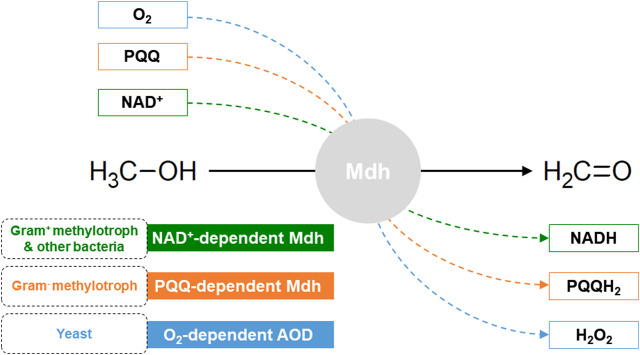
Shows the reaction of methanol to formaldehyde catalyzed by MDH.

=== NAD^{+} dependent MDH ===
A common electron acceptor in biological systems is nicotinamide adenine dinucleotide (NAD^{+}); some enzymes use a related molecule called nicotinamide adenine dinucleotide phosphate (NADP^{+}). An NAD^{+}-dependent methanol dehydrogenase (EC 1.1.1.244) was first reported in a Gram-positive methylotroph and is an enzyme that catalyzes the chemical reaction:

CH_{3}OH + NAD^{+} $\rightleftharpoons$ CH_{2}O + NADH + H^{+}

Thus, the two substrates of this enzyme are methanol and NAD^{+}, whereas its 3 products are formaldehyde (CH_{2}O), NADH, and H^{+}. This can be performed under both aerobic and anaerobic conditions.

NAD^{+} -dependent MDHs are found in thermophilic, Gram positive methylotrophs, but can also been obtained from some non-methylotrophic bacteria. NAD^{+}-dependent MDHs have so far been found in Bacillus sp., Lysinibacillus sp., and Cupriavidus sp.

=== PQQ-dependent MDH ===
For Gram-negative bacteria, methanol oxidation occurs in the periplasmic space, facilitated by PQQ-dependent MDH. PQQ-dependent MDHs contain a PQQ prosthetic group, which has the role of capturing electrons from methanol oxidation and passing them to the cytochrome.

MxaFI and XoxF are the genes that encode for PQQ-dependent MDHs. In MxaFI-type MDH, calcium (Ca^{2+}) is encoded as the cofactor for PQQ-dependent methylotrophy. XoxF-type MDHs use lanthanides (Ln^{3+}) as cofactors and are highly selective towards early lanthanides (typically La-Nd). Sm^{3+}, Eu^{3+}, and Gd^{3+} can support some XoxF-type organisms, but less effectively. Pm^{3+} and Tb-Lu have shown no evidence of utilization so far.

Many methylotrophs encode both MxaFI and XoxF, but those that encode only one will encode exclusively for XoxF.

=== O_{2}-dependent alcohol oxidase ===
Oxygen-dependent alcohol oxidase (AOX) can be obtained from eukaryotic methylotrophs in the peroxisome of yeasts. Formaldehyde and hydrogen peroxide (H_{2}O_{2}) are formed through the oxidation of methanol. Dihydroxyacetone synthase (DAS) and catalase (CTA) must then transform these toxic chemicals into non-toxic forms to protect the cell. In this process, electrons from methanol are not captured as usable energy by the cell, and are thus lost.
