= Environmental racism in the United States =

Environmental racism is a form of institutional racism, in which people of color bear a disproportionate burden of environmental harms, such as pollution from hazardous waste disposal and the effects of natural disasters. Environmental racism exposes Native Americans, African Americans, Asian Americans, Pacific Islanders, and Hispanic populations to physical health hazards and may negatively impact mental health. It creates disparities in many different spheres of life, such as transportation, housing, and economic opportunity.

Communities of color are more likely to be located next to pollution sources, such as landfills, power plants, and incinerators. There is evidence that exposure to pollution can result in a higher prevalence of disease. Additionally, low-income communities of color are more likely to have polluted water. An analysis of EPA data found that unequal access to safe drinking water is strongly correlated with race. The most polluted communities tend to be those with high poverty, inadequate infrastructure, substandard schools, chronic unemployment, and poor healthcare systems. Empirical evidence suggests environmental hazards negatively affect nearby property values, employment opportunities, and economic activities. In addition, environmental hazards can cause psychological stress.

Natural disasters also tend to have unequal impacts on communities of color. The extent of poverty within a region can often have a much stronger effect on the scale of a natural disaster's impact than the severity of the disaster itself. Affluent, white communities tend to be located on higher ground, so they are less vulnerable to floods than communities of color. Moreover, disaster prevention and recovery plans are often biased against minorities in low-income areas.

== History ==
The origins of the environmental justice movement can be traced to the Indigenous environmental movement, which itself has roots in over 500 years of colonialism, oppression, and ongoing struggles for sovereignty and land rights. In 1968, grassroots environmental activists from several tribal nations met in Minnesota and formed an organization known as the American Indian Movement (AIM).

The 1982 North Carolina PCB Protest is widely recognized as the origin of the environmental justice movement. In 1982, North Carolina state officials decided to place a landfill with highly toxic PCB-contaminated soil in the small town of Afton in Warren County, North Carolina. Afton was about 84% African American. This decision sparked the first national protest against the location of a hazardous waste facility. Organized by the National Association for the Advancement of Colored People, residents of Warren County, along with local civil rights and political leaders, gathered in opposition to the placement of the landfill site. Over 500 protesters were arrested. In response, two major studies were published: the US General Accounting Office 1983, and the United Church of Christ 1987. Both studies found that there was a strong relationship between race and the location of hazardous waste facilities.

The United States General Accounting Office study conducted a survey of the locations of hazardous-waste facilities, and found that these facilities were more likely to be located in minority and low-income communities. The United Church of Christ Commission for Racial Justice (CRJ) study found that three of the largest hazardous waste facilities were located in primarily Black areas, and accounted for 40% of the hazardous-waste landfill capacity in the United States. The study also found that the strongest predictor of the placement of hazardous waste facilities was race, surpassing both household income and home values. An additional study conducted by the CRJ found that three out of five African Americans and Hispanic Americans lived in communities with hazardous waste sites.

== Pollution ==
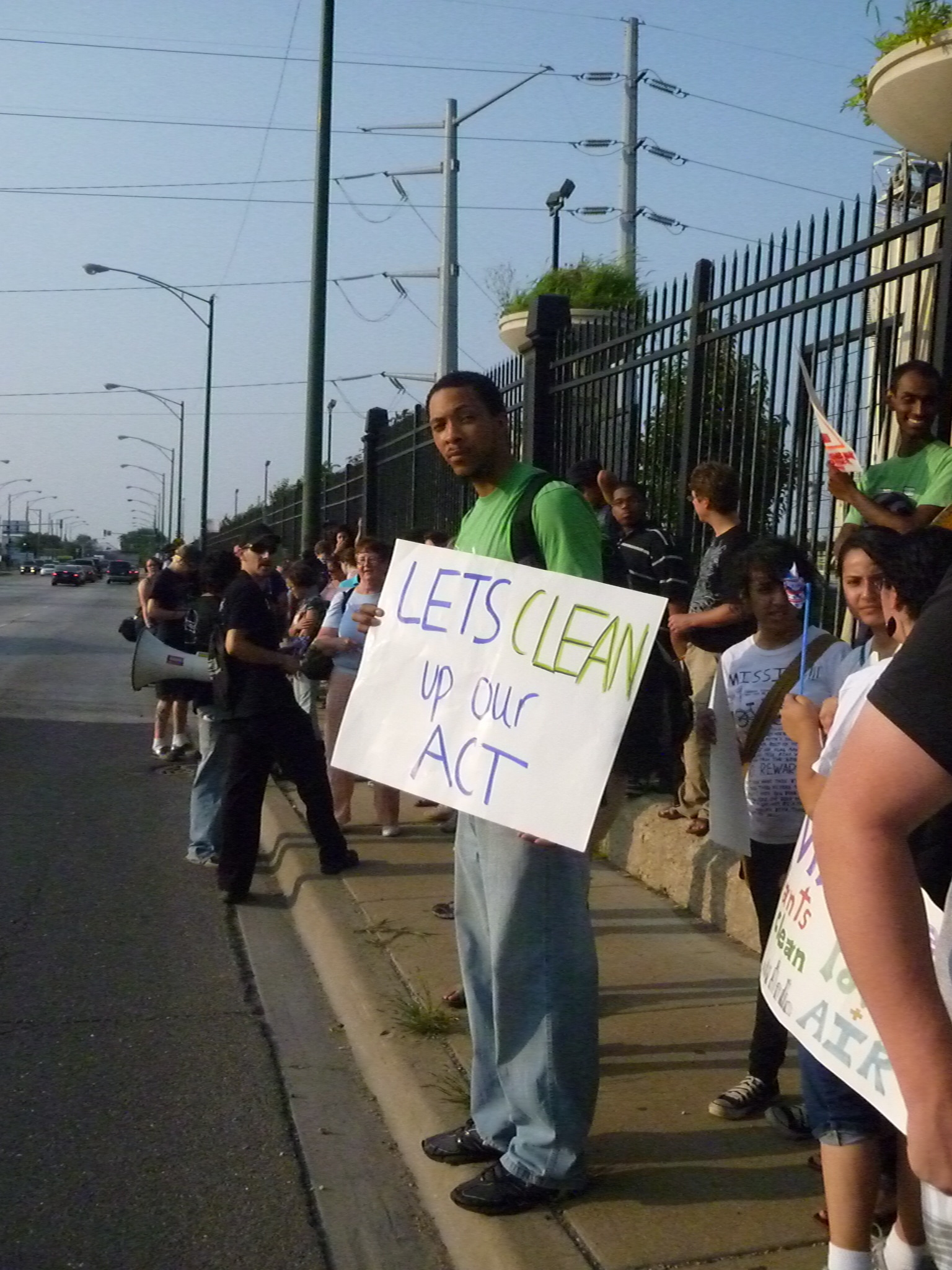
A protest at Crawford Coal Plant.

=== Agriculture ===
Concentrated animal feeding operations (CAFOs) contribute to the adverse health effects experienced by EJ communities by releasing harmful gas emissions into the air (ammonia, volatile organic compounds, endotoxins, etc.) greatly reducing the surrounding air quality. Some ways that these chemicals pollute the air are through barns that contain animals, the storage of waste specially hog operations, handling the wasted stored These pollutants in the air are able to carry and transmit disease-causing bacteria and certain fungi. They can also pollute the soil and nearby water sources. The most common adverse effects of CAFOs in humans are increased asthma and reduced lung function.

Methane emission is emitted and produced from organic compounds found in industrial wastewater and from the breakdown of animal manure, usually pigs, cows, and goats. Even when looking at a small scale, each animal's contribution is huge, one cow is able to produce up to 264 pounds of methane gas per year. While methane emissions from animals can cause adverse health effects, another important aspect to look at is the fact it is driving climate change. Climate change in EJ communities is the most impacted, not having the all the resources they need. Weather events in these communities are becoming more severe and dangerous, the agricultural industry is the biggest contributor of methane in the United States.

Pesticides have been used for thousands of years worldwide, in the United States most of the pesticide use is in agriculture. People and the families of people that work as a farmworker or as an agricultural worker are at the highest risk of the effects of these chemicals. Eighty-three percent of farmworkers identify themselves as Hispanic and one-third of all farmworkers have an income below the federal poverty line. From previous federal policies and racist lending practices have ensured that most of the farmlands in the United States are owned and operated by whites and has ensured that BIPOC and people living in low-income areas are the ones mostly impacted by pesticide pollution. According to research that was conducted in California; pesticide pollution has the greatest income, racial, and ethnic inequality in the state. While this research was done in California, this is unfortunately the case across the United States, BIPOC are the most impacted. The impacts that pesticides have on human health are dependent on the type that is used in that area, such as organophosphates and carbamates, which affect the nervous systems, while others may only irritate a person's eyes or skin, they may be cancer causing, or may affect hormones of the endocrine system.

=== Hazardous waste facilities ===
Recent studies show that hazardous waste facilities are more likely to be located in communities of color and low-income neighborhoods. In fact, communities with a high concentration of racial minorities are nine times more likely to be exposed to environmentally hazardous facilities than communities with a low concentration of minorities. A 2002 study in Massachusetts by sociologists Daniel R. Faber and Eric J. Krieg found racially based biases in the placement of 17 industrial waste facilities. Residential segregation is correlated with higher cancer risk; as segregation increases, cancer incidence is higher. A 2018 study by the American Journal of Public Health found that Black people are exposed to 54% more particulate matter than the average American. In Los Angeles, minority children have the highest risk of being exposed to air pollution at school. Environmental health scientists Rachel Morello-Frosch and Manuel Pastor Jr. found that "at schools ranked in the bottom fifth for air quality, the children were 92% minority." They also found that air pollution is associated with decreased achievement in school. The United States Environmental Protection Agency and United States Census Bureau found that, in the mid-Atlantic and Northeastern regions of the US, minorities are exposed to 66% more particulate matter from vehicles than white Americans. In a study in 2000 in Texas, sociologists Kingsley Ejiogu and Hon R. Tachia found that the percent Asians and percent Hispanics were significant predictors of toxic sites.

Environmental racism is very prevalent in many states across the country. Environmental racism raises ethical issues and can also have implications for a state's laws and constitution, for example the Clean Air Act, the Fourteenth Amendment and the Civil Rights Act.

An example of a case of environmental racism is a small mainly African American (90%) town called Uniontown, Alabama where a toxic landfill is believed to have caused serious health issues. In 2010, the Tennessee Valley Authority moved four million cubic yards of coal ash to a landfill in Uniontown without providing citizens any protection from the waste. Mental health issues, a one-in-five chance of developing cancer and reproductive issues were associated with mercury and arsenic contained within the ash.

Other examples include West Dallas, Texas, where African American housing projects have been set up twenty paces from a battery recycling smelter, and Chester, Pennsylvania, which has become an attraction for toxic waste sites. In California the government also decided to allow pollution in vulnerable communities. The effect of environmental racism is seen in the health data which shows that African Americans are three times more likely to die from asthma. Three out of five African Americans live in a community with a least one toxic waste site. On average it takes twenty percent longer for toxic sites in minority community towns to be placed on the national priority list than white areas.

=== Water pollution ===
A 2002 study published by the Annual Review of Public Health found that Low-income communities and communities of color are more likely to have contaminated drinking water. A 2019 study by a team of epidemiologists found that community water systems with higher nitrate concentrations tended to serve communities with higher proportions of Hispanic residents. Nitrates have been linked to cancer, reproductive problems, and death in infants. Additionally, contamination of drinking water contributes to 20 percent of lead poisoning in children; per studies in 2000 and 2004, low-income African American and Latino children have disproportionately high levels of lead in their blood.

Several case studies demonstrate race-based inequalities in access to clean water. A recent, highly publicized example of water pollution's disproportionate effect on racial minorities is the Flint water crisis. In 2014, Flint, Michigan, a city with a 57% Black population, switched its drinking water to the Flint River, which led to complaints about the water's taste and color. Studies found that the water was contaminated with lead from aging pipes. As of 2015, the US government had spent $80 million in addressing the Flint Water Crisis.

Another example is East Orosi, a small, low-income, Latino town in California's San Joaquin Valley where the groundwater was found to be contaminated with nitrates due to fertilizer runoff at nearby farms.

=== Air pollution ===
Air pollution is a growing problem in populous cities, particularly those neighboring airports. In the U.S., 70% of airborne lead exposure is caused by leaded aviation fuel. The Biden administration has prioritized efforts to reduce child lead exposure throughout their administration, but they have not yet banned the use of leaded aviation fuel. While the Clean Air Act of 1963 served to ban the uses of leaded gasoline, it has yet to address the continued consumption of leaded aviation fuel. The negative impact of the use of leaded aviation fuel can be seen in the case of the Reid-Hillview Airport in San Jose, where in 2021 blood lead levels of children living within a 1.5 mile radius of the airport tested at double that of children at the peak of the Flint Michigan Water crisis. Furthermore, 97% of the affected community identifies as non-white. Since then, the use of such fuel has been banned in Santa Clara County, but it remains a primary contributor of airborne lead in the rest of the United States.

== Health effects ==
Minority populations are exposed to greater environmental health risks than white people, according to the Environmental Protection Agency (EPA). The advocacy organisation Greenlining cites EPA assessments finding that Blacks are exposed to 1.5 times more air pollutants causing heart and lung disease than whites, while exposure rates for Hispanics were 1.2 times the amount for non-Hispanic whites. People in poverty had 1.3 times the exposure of those not in poverty.

Environmental pollution has been found to cause physical and mental disabilities, cancer, and asthma. Exposure to industrial chemicals have correlated with increased cancer rates, learning disabilities, and neurobehavioral disorders. Some industrial chemicals have been identified as endocrine disruptors, which means they interfere with the functioning of hormones. Endocrine disrupters have been linked to attention deficit hyperactivity disorder, Parkinson's disease, Alzheimer's disease, metabolic disorders, diabetes, cardiovascular disease, obesity, and infertility. There is a strong link between cancer and childhood exposure to pesticides, solvents, and other toxic substances.

Non-white populations, especially Black Americans, are exposed to a higher concentration of harmful chemicals than white populations. High-emissions in majority-Black areas may contribute to the high prevalence of conditions such as cardiovascular disease mortality and asthma in Black populations. Additionally, climate change has been found to increase the frequency of extreme heat and pollen events that exacerbate asthma, disproportionately affecting pediatric ED visits of BIPOC.

A row of industrial plants in Louisiana has now been dubbed "Cancer Alley" due to the high prevalence of cancer cases in the surrounding communities. This area is about 50% African-American, and has a 20.7% poverty rate. One study found that rates of stomach cancer, diabetes, and heart disease were significantly higher in Cancer Alley, and in Louisiana, than the United States overall.

Since the 1700s, power companies have dumped coal ash into pits and ponds, especially in the Southeast. Coal ash is mostly composed of lead, arsenic, selenium, and mercury. Each of these minerals individually are unsafe for the human body, but scientists are unsure of how harmful the components are combined. Mercury, for example, can damage reproductive health. Lead causes developmental disorders, arsenic can lead to rashes and lesions. Kristina Zierold, an environmental health scientist and epidemiologist, concluded that there are clusters of cancer around coal ash sites where workers are exposed. However, scientists have not been able to prove a direct link between coal ash and cancer. Measuring coal ash's impact on a control group would be dangerous and unethical, so researchers have had to extrapolate based on their current knowledge of toxins. Researchers have observed that the placement of a coal ash dump near a community causes dramatic increases in cancer rates and neurological issues among children.

Low-income households and people of color are often unable to afford adequate healthcare to treat pollution-related health problems. One study found that 34% of adults live without healthcare coverage in a primarily African-American, low-income neighborhood in Chicago. This results in the compounding of health issues within these communities, and exacerbates a cycle of poverty; sickness eats up money, often forcing families to sell assets to pay off medical debt and/or quit a job to take care of family members. It also results in less money to pass down to children or share with local organizations, such as schools.

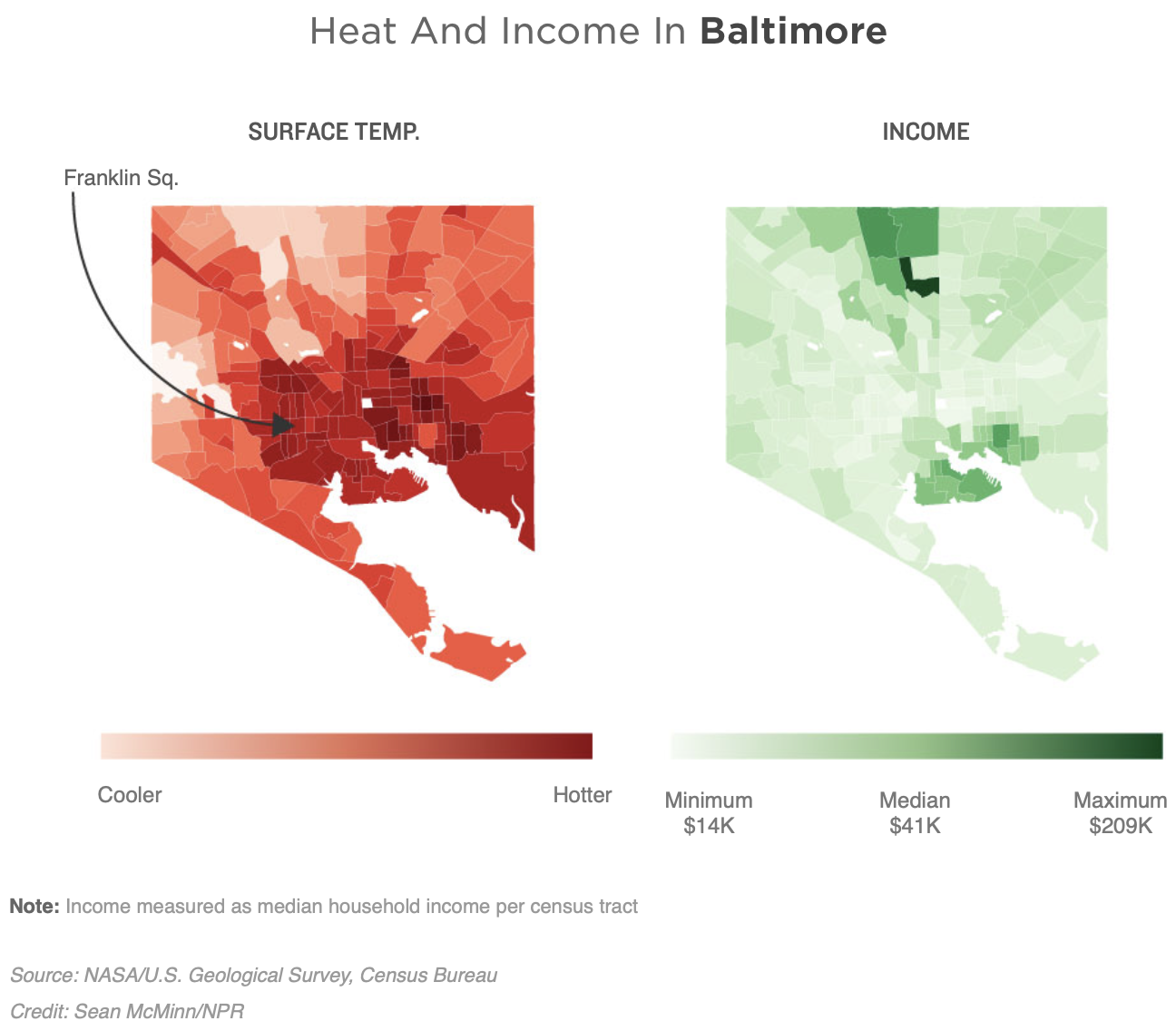
The graph above demonstrates the correlation between income and heat in the city of Baltimore, Maryland. Low-income neighborhoods are seen with higher summer temperatures than higher-income neighborhoods during the same period. The data was provided to authors Anderson and Mcminn by NASA/U.S. Geological Survey, Census Bureau.

A study involving 108 urban areas found that neighborhoods with a history of redlining were five to twelve degrees hotter than neighborhoods without redlining. This increase in temperature is caused by the urban heat island, an area which has a slightly warmer climate than the surrounding area. Low income communities are acutely at risk to heat mortality because of reduced access to air conditioning as well as tree cover. "Temperatures on a scorching summer day can vary as much as 20 degrees across different parts of the same city, with poor or minority neighborhoods often bearing the brunt of that heat".

== Natural disasters ==
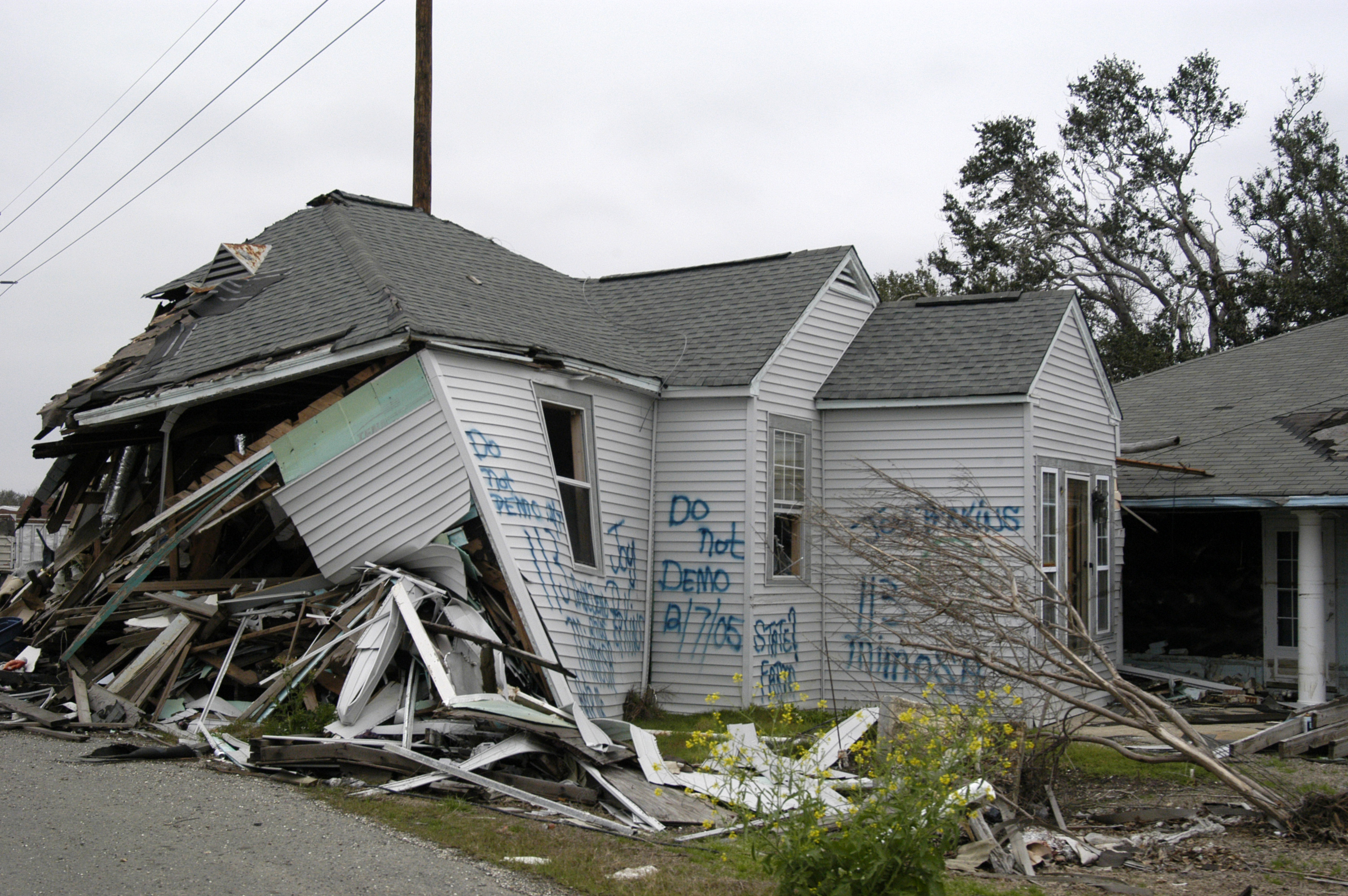
A house crushed by flooding from a breached levee in the Ninth Ward, New Orleans, due to Hurricane Katrina

The immediate impact of a natural disaster does not discriminate, but responses do when the lingering results of structural racism hinder relief. Natural disasters have historically had a larger impact on poor African Americans than wealthy whites. Structural disinvestment in communities of color additionally reduces their ability to respond to climate disasters, for instance, Black survivors of natural disasters are less likely to receive FEMA assistance. In counties hit by natural disasters, the wealth of white residents increased while Black residents fell. In 2020, FEMA's advisory council admitted the historic unfairness in federal disaster response and asked the agency to address the issue.

In particular, Black people were disproportionately affected by Hurricane Katrina. Predominantly Black communities were more likely to be located in low-lying areas that were more vulnerable to flooding. Evacuation plans were insufficient for populations without access to a car. At the time, over a third of New Orleans' African-American residents did not have cars. The city also only had one-quarter the number of buses that would have been necessary to evacuate all car-less residents, and many buses were lost during the flooding. The disorganized response to the storm and flooding also disproportionately affected Black victims. Michael D. Brown, the head of the Federal Emergency Management Agency, was not aware of starving crowds at the New Orleans Convention Center until he heard about it on the news. Deliveries of supplies to the convention center did not arrive until four days after Katrina hit.

Another example is the 1928 Okeechobee hurricane, the first category 5 hurricane officially recorded in the Atlantic. The storm devastated much of the southern coast of Florida, but hit low-lying, Black migrant-worker communities particularly hard. In fact, over 75% of the 3000 recorded deaths were Black migrant workers. Most Black bodies were burned or buried in mass graves. The towns of Belle Glade, Pahokee, and South Bay were "virtually wiped off the map".

Natural disasters have also been used as an opportunity to oppress African Americans. For example, during the Great Mississippi Flood of 1927, whites were evacuated, while African Americans were placed into disaster-relief "concentration camps" and forced to work while being held at gunpoint.

== Access to public green space ==
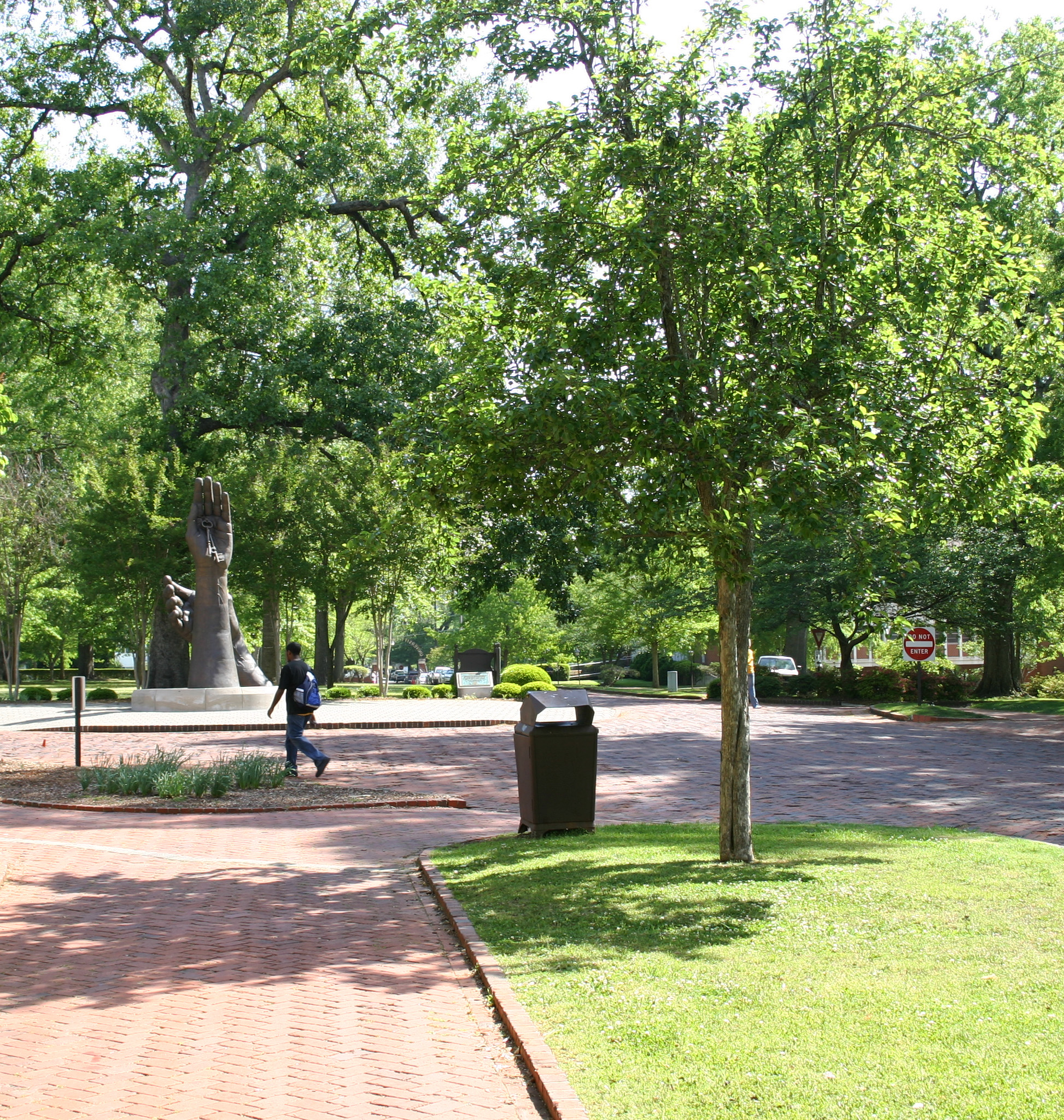
Public Green Space in Alabama.

A study by sociologist Salvatore Saporito and Daniel Casey found that urban green space is generally distributed unequally across racial and economic groups. Low-income, people of color tend to live in areas with less vegetation than their white, wealthy counterparts. There is also a relationship between "city-level racial and economic segregation and differences in exposure to green space between the members of different racial and income groups." The more segregated a city is, the more likely it is that neighborhoods with large concentrations of racial minorities will have less green space than white neighborhoods.

According to Ian Leahy, "the wealthiest neighborhoods have 65% more tree canopy cover than the highest poverty neighborhoods." Tree canopy cover is the measure of the percentage of the ground covered by a vertical projection of the tree. Inequities in tree canopy cover and the presence of urban green space arise from policies such as redlining. Redlining is the "historical practice of refusing home loans or insurance to whole neighborhoods based on a racially motivated perception of safety for investment." This policy affected mainly Black and Latino individuals, thus shaping the current urban green spaces. Redlined areas have less green space, are on average 2.6 degrees Celsius warmer than neighboring areas, and experience other environmental hazards, leading to discussions of heath disparities.

There are few studies on the link between green spaces and health, but it is a rising concern with increasing urbanization and spatial planning policies of densification. There is one epidemiological study that was performed in the Netherlands that showed a positive link between abundant green spaces and better health mostly apparent among the elderly, housewives, and people from lower socioeconomic groups. Other small epidemiological studies show that green space is positively correlated with self perceived health, number of symptoms experienced, and mortality risk. The U.S. Department of Agriculture states that the relationship between urban green space and health is intrinsically related and recent studies show that immersion in natural landscapes can reduce stress and improve mental and social health. Research continues in underserved communities and the link of green space to health outcomes.

The presence of green space in one's living environment has been found to have an important impact on physical and mental health. Green space can contribute to stress reduction and attention restoration, as well as improved social cohesion and increased physical activity.

A proposal to develop a police training facility at the Old Atlanta Prison Farm in Atlanta, Georgia has resulted in community protest. Opponents to the project would like to conserve the area as part of the 3500 acre South River forest (a large green space in southeast Atlanta), and they have said that the development is an example of environmental racism that will lead to increased police brutality against people of color.

== Native Americans ==
=== History ===
According to Potawatomi philosopher Kyle Powys Whyte and Lower Brule Sioux historian Nick Estes, the first "environmental apocalypse" is the coming of colonialism. Settlers used industrial military technologies to systematically kill Native Americans and force their removal. Then, they harnessed indigenous land for agriculture and industrial facilities. Settlers dramatically changed ecosystems through deforestation, overharvesting, and pollution. Additionally, academics Zoe Todd and Heather Davis propose that colonialism has played a major role in environmental degradation. The beginning of colonialism marked the beginning of the Anthropocene. When European settlers landed in the Americas in 1492, they set in motion the Columbian Exchange, drastically reshaping the biology and ecological landscape of the Americas. Simultaneously, there was a drop in carbon dioxide levels in the geologic layer following the genocide of indigenous people in the Americas and the regrowth of plants. Settler colonialism is marked by the process of "terraforming"—damming of rivers, clear-cutting of forests, and importation of plants and animals.

For instance, in colonial New England, settlers cleared forests and woodlands for farms and sent the cleared forest wood back to England to be used in soap and glass manufacturing. Settlers believed that deforestation would lead to warmer winters like those in England, which would attract more British colonists to the region and allow settlers to grow the crops they preferred. For example, according to U.S. Constitution signee Hugh Williamson, warming temperatures would create a more pleasurable environment, proving that the continent was better off because of, and in the hands of, white settlers. These early settlers also believed that deforestation would create an environment more hospitable to those with "fair skin" instead of "savages."

Throughout the nineteenth century, as the United States spread its territory from the Atlantic Ocean to the Pacific Ocean, Native Americans were pushed onto reservations, which were often lands that were deemed undesirable to white settlers because of poor soil quality. Additionally, they tended to be located next to tracts of federally owned land. During World War II, a significant number of military facilities were built or expanded onto these federal lands. The United States sought "remote lands to house bombing ranges and related noxious activities," and, thus, many facilities contained dangerous unexploded ordnance, putting Native populations at risk of exposure to toxic chemicals. In the early 1990s, the United States government attempted to blackmail Native populations by offering tribes millions of dollars for hosting nuclear waste facilities. This offer was appealing to many tribes because of extreme poverty on reservations.

Through the 1940s and 1950s, the US Military responded to wartime industry by erecting uranium mines in the southwestern deserts. The nearest residents were almost exclusively Native American tribal members. Navajo and Hopi drinking water supply in Nevada, Arizona, and New Mexico continues to this day to be affected by runoff and pollution from neighboring mines.

=== Hazardous waste on reservations ===
Because Native Americans live at the lowest socioeconomic level in the U.S., they are at the highest risk for toxic exposure. The risk is multiplied for indigenous people because they rely on land affected by the accumulation of toxic materials for food supplies. One significant environmental hazard on tribal land is the construction of government and commercial hazardous waste sitings. A survey of 25 Indian reservations revealed that there were 1200 hazardous waste activity sites on or near the selected reservations. According to a study by sociologists Gregory Hooks and Chad L. Smith, indigenous reservations are positively associated with extremely dangerous sites, far above the national average. Examples of hazardous sites include a nuclear power plant built on the edge of the Mdewakanton Sioux of Prairie Island reservation, cyanide heap-leach mining polluting water on the Fort Belknap Indian Reservation, and industrial waste dumps surrounding the St. Regis Mohawk Reservation. Furthermore, a disproportionate number of dangerous military facilities are located on or near Native land. Hooks' and Smith's study also found that the risk assessment code commonly used to measure the danger levels of a site may underestimate the damage it inflicts on Native American communities. Instead, the hazard probability model accounts for the fact that hazardous chemicals are in close proximity to public spaces, such as schools and hospitals.

Illegal dumping is another large environmental threat on tribal land. There are two categories of people who illegally dump on Native American reservations. Midnight dumpers are corporations and individuals that dump their waste on reservations without the permission of tribal governments. Native entrepreneurs are tribal members who contaminate Native land without tribal permission. Waste poses a severe health risk, leading to leukemia, organ ailments, asthma, and other conditions. Illegal pollution also results in a loss of tribal sovereignty by creating conditions in which intervention on the part of the United States federal government becomes necessary. The removal of toxic waste can be used as a "pretext to revert to past patterns of paternalism and control over Native American affairs on the reservation." For example, in the case of the Kaibab-Paitute tribe, the Waste Tech Corporation used the disposal of waste as an excuse to restrict tribal access to their own land and attempted to give themselves the unilateral right to determine where roads would be built.

=== Water quality ===
Native American communities are more likely to have contaminated drinking water. In 2006, 61% percent of drinking water systems on Native American reservations had health violations or other violations, compared to 27% of all public drinking water systems in the United States.

A highly publicized example of water pollution on a reservation is the Dakota Access Pipeline. The Dakota Access Pipeline transports oil from North Dakota to an oil terminal in Illinois. Although it does not cross directly on a reservation, the pipeline is under scrutiny because it passes under a section of the Missouri River which is the main drinking water source for the Standing Rock Sioux Tribe. Pipelines are known to break, with the Pipeline and Hazardous Materials Safety Administration (PHMSA) reporting more than 3,300 leak and rupture incidents for oil and gas pipelines since 2010. The pipeline also traverses a sacred burial ground for the Standing Rock Sioux Tribe. Kelly Morgan, the Standing Rock Sioux's tribal archeologist, has voiced concerns that the water crossings destroy land used for burials and other important historical and cultural information, including several stones and markers. These concerns were ignored. President Barack Obama revoked the permit for the project in December 2016 and ordered a study on rerouting the pipeline. President Donald Trump reversed this order and authorized the completion of the pipeline. The pipeline remains commercially operable. There are still ongoing litigation efforts by the Standing Rock Sioux Tribe opposing the Dakota Access Pipeline in an effort to shut it down permanently.

Additionally, in 2015, the Gold King Mine spill contaminated 3 million gallons of water in the Colorado River, which served as a primary source of drinking water for the Navajo and Hopi nations downstream. The Navajo and Hopi subsequently recorded dangerously high levels of arsenic and lead in their water supply. Through the following litigative proceedings, the US EPA appropriated just $156,000 in reparations to those affected by the Gold King Mine spill.

Declining riparian oxygen has also affected Washington's Quinault tribe which has reported greater levels of dead fish, affecting their seafood business.

== Civil rights litigation ==
The environmental justice movement in the US was heavily influenced by the civil rights movement, and shares many of the same goals and tactics. Existing community organizations and leaders that contributed to mobilize the civil rights movement have also engaged in environmental justice work. Several prominent environmental justice lawsuits in the US have attempted to claim discrimination based on the Civil Rights Act of 1964, though none of these have so far been successful.

=== Litigation ===
Some environmental justice lawsuits have been based on civil rights laws. The first case to claim environmental discrimination in the siting of a waste facility under civil rights law was Bean v. Southwestern Waste Management, Inc. (1979). With the legal representation of Linda McKeever Bullard, residents of Houston's Northwood Manor opposed the decision of the city and Browning Ferris Industries to construct a solid waste facility near their mostly African-American neighborhood. Although the Northwood Manor residents lost the case, there were several lasting outcomes: the city of Houston later restricted the dumping of waste near public facilities such as schools; the strategy of using civil rights law in environmental justice cases was adopted in other cases, and Bullard's husband (Robert Bullard) became an increasingly visible scholar and writer on environmental justice.

The Equal Protection Clause of the Fourteenth Amendment has been used in many environmental justice cases. This strategy requires that the plaintiff prove discriminatory intent on the part of the defendant, which is very difficult and has never been done in an environmental justice case.

Title VI of the Civil Rights Act of 1964 has also been used in lawsuits that claim environmental inequality. The two most relevant sections in these cases are sections 601 and 602. section 601 prohibits discrimination based on race, color, or national origin by any government agency receiving federal funds. To win an environmental justice case that claims an agency violated this statute, the plaintiff must prove the agency intended to discriminate. Section 602 requires agencies to create rules and regulations that uphold section 601. This section is useful because the plaintiff must only prove that the rule or regulation in question had disparate impact. While disparate impact is much easier to demonstrate than discriminatory intent, cases brought under section 602 are not typically successful. It is also unclear whether citizens have right of action to sue under section 602. In Seif v. Chester Residents Concerned for Quality Living (1998), a district court determined that residents did not have right of action; but this decision was overturned in an appeal. When the case went to the supreme court, the case was dismissed as moot because the plaintiff had withdrawn their permit. Earlier decisions in the lower courts were vacated, leaving no judgment on the books establishing citizen right of action for section 602.

Successful environmental justice litigation has typically used environmental law or tort law. While cases brought under civil rights law may have political advantages, these cases are not typically successful in court.

== Policy responses ==
Five cities, including Seattle, Portland, Baltimore, Chicago, and Oakland, have passed ordinances banning fossil fuel storage and infrastructure expansion.

=== Federal agencies ===
In the United States it was also found that income inequality greatly affected the quality of the environment in which people live. People of colour and the poor in America on average experience much lower quality environments than white people or the wealthy. Action was taken in the early 1990s by the American Government in an attempt to improve environmental quality for poorer regions. In 1992 the United States Environmental Protection Agency set up the Office of Environmental Equity, now known as the Office of Environmental Justice, to address the situation at hand. However the Office of Environmental Justice's work was undermined by Congress who refused to pass the bills which were presented to them by the EPA. Instead states began to pass their own bills which did very little to improve environmental quality for poorer areas. As a result, there has been little to no change in the ratios of environmental inequality whereas there has been a decline in the ratios of race and poverty.

==== Background ====
In 1994, President Clinton issued Executive Order 12898, "Federal Actions to Address Environmental Justice in Minority Populations and Low-Income Populations", which required environmental justice to be part of each federal agency's mission. Under Executive Order 12898 federal agencies must:

1. enforce all health and environmental statutes in areas with minority and low-income populations;
2. ensure public participation;
3. improve research and data collection relating to the health and environment of minority and low-income populations; and
4. identify differential patterns of consumption of natural resources among minority and low-income populations.

EO 12898 established an Interagency Working Group on Environmental Justice that is chaired by the EPA Administrator and heads of 17 departments, agencies, and several White House offices in order to collectively promote and advance environmental justice principles. This was a historical step in addressing environmental injustice on a policy level; however, the effectiveness of the Order is noted mainly in its influence on states as Congress never passed a bill making Clinton's Executive Order law. Many states began to require relevant agencies to develop strategies and programs that would identify and address environmental injustices being perpetrated at the state or local level.

In 2005, during President George W. Bush's administration, there was an attempt to remove the premise of racism from the Order. EPA's Administrator Stephen Johnson wanted to redefine the Order's purpose to shift from protecting low income and minority communities that may be disadvantaged by government policies to all people. Obama's appointment of Lisa Jackson as EPA Administrator and the issuance of Memorandum of Understanding on Environmental Justice and Executive Order 12898 established a recommitment to environmental justice. The fight against environmental racism faced some setbacks with the election of Trump. Under Trump's administration, there was a mandated decrease of EPA funding accompanied by a rollback on regulations which has left many underrepresented communities vulnerable.

Title VI of the Civil Rights Act of 1964 also forbids federal agencies from providing grants or funding opportunities to discriminatory programs.

==== U.S. Environmental Protection Agency ====
The Office of Environmental Justice (OEJ) was created in 1992 and has coordinated efforts of the EPA to meet environmental justice goals. The Office of Environmental Justice provides technical and financial assistance to communities working to address environmental justice issues. The National Environmental Justice Advisory Council (NEJAC) provides independent advice and recommendations to the EPA Administrator that crosses various environmental justice issues. The Tribal Consultation & Indigenous People's Engagement works with federally recognized tribes and other indigenous peoples to prioritize their environmental and public health issues.

===== Tools and direct support =====
OEJ provides financial resources for creating healthy, sustainable and equitable communities through the Environmental Justice Small Grants Program and the Collaborative Problem-Solving Cooperative Agreement Program. As of 2016, more than $36 million of financial assistance has been given to nearly 1,500 community-based organizations.

The Technical Assistance Services for Communities program provides a way for communities to gain better understanding of the decision-making process as well as assist to understand the science, regulations, and policies that impact environmental issues and EPA actions.

The EPA website on environmental justice has various resources such as EJSCREEN, a mapping tool and screening tool, Guidance on Considering Environmental Justice During the Development of an Action, Technical Guidance for Assessing Environmental Justice in Regulatory Analysis, trainings and workshops, and the Legal Tools Development document.

===== Emergency Planning and Right to Know Act of 1986 =====
After the Bhopal disaster, where a Union Carbide plant released forty tons of methyl isocyanate into the atmosphere in a village just south of Bhopal, India, the U.S. government passed the Emergency Planning and Right to Know Act of 1986. Introduced by Henry Waxman, the act required all corporations to report their toxic chemical pollution annually, which was then gathered into a report known as the Toxics Release Inventory (TRI).

===== Corporate Toxics Information Report =====
The Corporate Toxics Information Project (CTIP) provides information and analysis on corporate pollution and its consequences for communities. The project develops corporate rankings, regional reports, industry reports based on industrial sectors, and presents this data in a web-based resource open to the public. The data is collected by the EPA and then analyzed and disseminated by the PERI institute.

Since 2004, the CTIP has also published an index of the top 100 corporate air polluters in the United States. The list is based on the EPA's Risk Screening Environmental Indicators (RSEI), which "assesses the chronic human health risk from industrial toxic releases", as well as the TRI. The Toxic 100 has been updated five times, with the latest update in 2016.

==== U.S. Department of Agriculture ====
The US Department of Agriculture (USDA) is the executive agency responsible for federal policy on food, agriculture, natural resources, and quality of life in rural America. The USDA has more than 100,000 employees and delivers over $96.5 billion in public services to programs worldwide. In its 2012 environmental justice strategy, the USDA stated a desire to integrate environmental justice into its core mission and operations. USDA does fund programs with social and environmental equity goals; however, it has no staff dedicated solely to EJ.

===== 2012 Environmental Justice Strategy =====
On February 7, 2012, the USDA released a new Environmental Justice Strategic Plan identifying goals and performance measures beyond what USDA identified in a 1995 EJ strategy that was adopted in response to E.O. 12898. Generally, USDA believes its existing technical and financial assistance programs provide solutions to environmental inequity, such as its initiatives on education, food deserts, and economic development in impacted communities.

===== Initiatives in marginalized communities =====
====== Tribal outreach ======
The US EPA holds annual conferences, such as the Tribal Leaders Environmental Forum (TLEF), with Native American tribal leaders; EPA employees and tribal representatives meet in issue-based listening sessions and exchange environmental policy suggestions. The USDA has had a role in implementing Michelle Obama's Let's Move campaign in tribal areas by increasing Bureau of Indian Education schools' participation in federal nutrition programs: they develop community gardens on tribal lands, build tribal food policy councils, and provide Rural Development funding for community infrastructure in Indian Country. The U.S. Forest Service (USFS) is working to update its policy on protection and management of Native American Sacred Sites, an effort that has included listening sessions and government-to-government consultation. The Animal and Plant Health Inspection Service (APHIS) has also consulted with Tribes regarding management of reintroduced species where tribes may have a history of subsistence-level hunting of those species.

Meanwhile, the Agricultural Marketing Service (AMS) is exploring a program to use meat from bisons raised on tribal land to supply AMS food distribution programs to tribes. The Intertribal Technical Assistance Network works to improve access of tribal governments, communities and individuals to USDA technical assistance programs. Federally recognized tribes are also eligible to apply for "Treatment as State" (TAS) status with the EPA, which gives the tribe jurisdictional authority to enforce their own environmental programs, regulations, and quality standards over nearby polluters or over the state in which they reside.

====== Technical and financial assistance ======
The NRCS Strike Force Initiative has identified impoverished counties in Mississippi, Georgia and Arkansas to receive increased outreach and training regarding USDA assistance programs. USDA credits this increased outreach with generating a 196 percent increase in contracts, representing more than 250,000 acres of farmland, in its Environmental Quality Incentives Program. In 2001, NRCS funded and published a study, "Environmental Justice: Perceptions of Issues, Awareness and Assistance," focused on rural, Southern "Black Belt" counties and analyzing how the NRCS workforce could more effectively integrate environmental justice into impacted communities.

The Farm Services Agency in 2011 devoted $100,000 of its Socially Disadvantaged Farmers and Ranchers program budget to improving its outreach to counties with persistent poverty. USDA's Risk Management Agency has initiated education and outreach to low-income farmers regarding use of biological controls, rather than pesticides, for pest control. The Rural Utilities Service administers water and wastewater loans, including SEARCH Grants that are targeted to financially distressed, small rural communities and other opportunities specifically for Alaskan Native villages.

====== Mapping ======
USFS has established several Urban Field Stations, to research urban natural resources' structure, function, stewardship, and benefits. By mapping urban tree coverage, the agency hopes to identify and prioritize EJ communities for urban forest projects.

Another initiative highlighted by the agency is the Food and Nutrition Service and Economic Research Service's Food Desert Locator. The Locator provides a spatial view of food deserts, defined as a low-income census tract where a substantial number or share of residents has low access to a supermarket or large grocery store. The mapped deserts can be used to direct agency resources to increase access to fresh fruits and vegetables and other food assistance programs.

The US EPA database EJ Screen is publicly available. EJ Screen maps the United States with socioeconomically determinant factors including income level and race, as well as environmental health data including rates of asthma and cancer occurrence in a given area. Where there is high correlation between socioeconomic determinants and detrimental health impacts, "EJ communities" are noted. Examples of EJ communities include: the US territories, and the states of Alaska and Hawaii.

The purpose of EJ tools is to delve into the injustices of underrepresented communities. Another purpose for EJ tools is to uncover the underrepresentation of infectious diseases and climate impacts in these communities. Cumulative impact assessments and community engagement has become a new policy focus, since they help guide investments and resources towards disadvantaged communities. The more precisely the tools can cater towards an impacted community through the policy responses, the more contextually appropriate these interventions will be. This is in contrast to another tool, CEJEST, which though historically very effective, yet does not capture the granular state-specific issues in specific locations as smaller tools would.

When speaking about underinclusiveness, some biological examples would include cancer and other chronic illnesses that would only temporarily affect the averages of data compiled. The conversation then derives from what communicable disease reporting systems are versus non-communicable diseases. Communicable disease reporting systems are based on a large range of data from people, meanwhile, the non-communicable diseases are more difficult to attain because not a lot of people have these diseases. Given that not a lot of people have those diseases, investors are not willing to learn more about them to find a cure. This leads to the non-communicable diseases being misunderstood and not becoming official when it comes to being asked about them in a survey or census.

Following the conversation involving community involvement, understanding what the community looks like is also important. Addressing questions in maps such as the age range, language, and ethnicity, would open up the range of social vulnerability in terms of which race is less likely to have health care or have a secure living situation. Thus, being able to provide information to them so that they would be able to understand in their language.

Environmental versus climate indicators are different because environmental indicators are chronic exposures compared to progressive risks. Progressive risks are environmental effects that are more long-term term like the summers in California becoming progressively hotter. Meanwhile, chronic exposures include things such as air pollution. "EJ tools should strive to include a range of climate indicators that capture both short-term and long-term impacts, as well as the adaptive capacity of communities (Füssel, 2010)." If mapping tools were to provide the long term and short term depiction of these impacts, analyses them from urban planners and policy makers research would understand the level of impact that they'd receive.

Tying in on the underinclusiveness amongst neighbors in terms of how the information would be distributed. To understand a community, through methods and ways through language the community utilizes, understanding who the grandparents are, how tall they are, and what their interested are, then sparking a conversation that would allow the to develop.

== Activism ==
Concentrations of ethnic or racial minorities may also foster solidarity, lending support in spite of challenges and providing the concentration of social capital necessary for grassroots activism. Citizens who are tired of being subjected to the dangers of pollution in their communities have been confronting the power structures through organized protest, legal actions, marches, civil disobedience, and other activities.

Racial minorities are often excluded from politics and urban planning (such as sea level rise adaptation planning) so various perspectives of an issue are not included in policy making that may affect these excluded groups in the future. In general, political participation in African American communities is correlated with the reduction of health risks and mortality. Other strategies in battling against large companies include public hearings, the elections of supporters to state and local offices, meetings with company representatives, and other efforts to bring about public awareness and accountability.

In addressing this global issue, activists take to various social media platforms to both raise awareness and call to action. The mobilization and communication between the intersectional grassroots movements where race and environmental imbalance meet has proven to be effective. The movement gained traction with the help of Twitter, Facebook, Instagram, and Snapchat among other platforms. Celebrities such as Shailene Woodley, who advocated against the Keystone XL Pipeline, have shared their experiences including that of being arrested for protesting. Social media has allowed for a facilitated conversation between peers and the rest of the world when it comes to social justice issues not only online but in face-to-face interactions correspondingly.

Before the 1970s, communities of color recognized the reality of environmental racism and organized against it. For example, the Black Panther Party organized survival programs that confronted the inequitable distribution of trash in predominantly black neighborhoods. Similarly, the Young Lords, a Puerto Rican revolutionary nationalist organization based in Chicago and New York City, protested pollution and toxic refuse present in their community via the Garbage Offensive program. These and other organizations also worked to confront the unequal distribution of open spaces, toxic lead paint, and healthy food options. They also offered health programs to those affected by preventable, environmentally induced diseases such as tuberculosis. In this way, these organizations serve as precursors to more pointed movements against environmental racism.

Latino ranch laborers composed by Cesar Chavez battled for working environment rights, including insurance from harmful pesticides in the homestead fields of California's San Joaquin Valley. In 1967, African-American understudies rioted in the streets of Houston to battle a city trash dump in their locale that had killed two children. In 1968, occupants of West Harlem, in New York City, battled unsuccessfully against the siting of a sewage treatment plant in their neighborhood.

Efforts of activism have also been heavily influenced by women and the injustices they face from environmental racism. Women of different races, ethnicities, economic status, age, and gender are disproportionately affected by issues of environmental injustice. Additionally, the efforts made by women have historically been overlooked or challenged by efforts made by men, as the problems women face have been often avoided or ignored. Winona LaDuke is one of many female activists working on environmental issues, in which she fights against injustices faced by indigenous communities. LaDuke inducted into the National Women's Hall of Fame in 2007 for her continuous leadership towards justice.

Fighting against industrial facilities that were adding to the air, water and soil pollution caused by a nearby smelter that had operated for more than a century in Denver, Colorado, environmental and social justice activist Lorraine Granado and other residents of that city's Elyria-Swansea and Globeville neighborhoods formed Neighbors for a Toxic-Free Community. In 1991, they prevented the city from erecting a medical waste incinerator in their neighborhood. Three years later, they were involved in a successful class-action lawsuit that forced executives of ASARCO to clean up the pollution caused by the company's smelting plant. ASARCO subsequently paid $38 million to clean up arsenic, trioxide, cadmium, lead and other soil pollutants in Globeville and also paid $24 million in compensation to residents for decreased property values caused by the plant's pollution.

=== Art ===
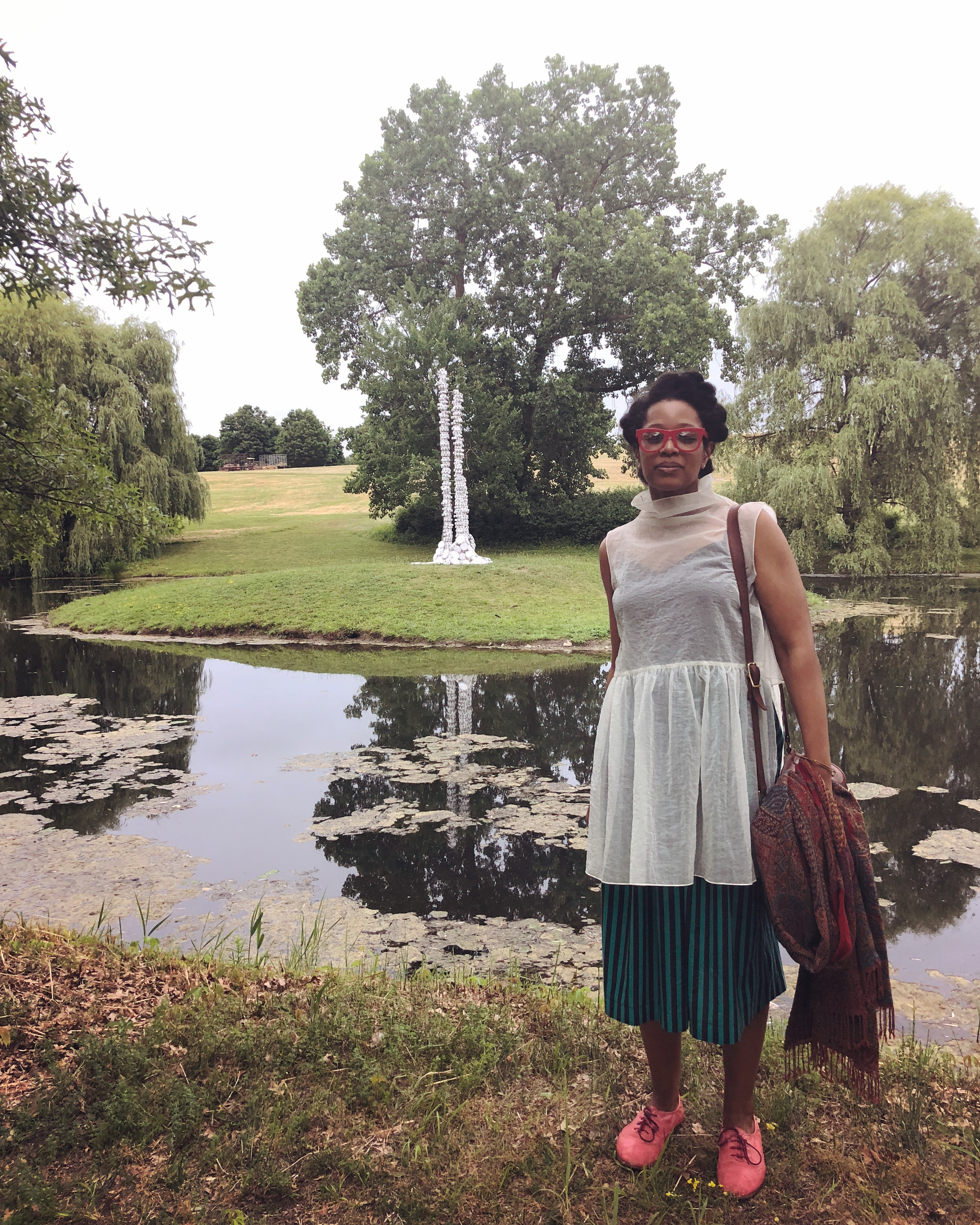
Allison Janae Hamilton in front of one of her works called "The peo-ple cried mer-cy in the storm".

Allison Janae Hamilton is an artist who focuses her work on examining the social and political ideas and uses of land and space, particularly in the Southern United States. Her work looks at who is affected by a changing climate, as well as the unique vulnerability that certain populations have. Her work relies on videos and photographs to show who is affected by global warming, and how their different lived experiences lend different perspectives to climate issues.

== Energy ==
While alternative energies such as nuclear power and hydroelectric power are viewed as low-cost alternatives to traditional power like coal and oil and gas, each presents its own environmental justice issues.

=== Nuclear power ===
Nuclear power has affected Native American peoples primarily through uranium mining and nuclear waste storage on Native American lands. According to Ojibwe activist Winona LaDuke, "over 1,000 abandoned uranium mines lie on the Navajo reservation, largely untouched by any attempts to cover or cap or even landscape the toxic wastes."

According to academic Traci Brynne Voyles, "Rates of lung cancer and respiratory disease have skyrocketed for the Diné, a population described as recently as the 1950s by public health experts as being 'immune' to lung cancer. By the mid-1980s, researchers found astronomical rates of cancer deaths among former uranium miners." Further, "Radiation-related diseases are now endemic to many parts of the Navajo Nation, claiming the health and lives of former miners to be sure but also those of Navajos who would never see the inside of a mine. Diné children have a rate of testicular and ovarian cancer fifteen times the national average, and a fatal neurological disease called Navajo neuropathy has been closely linked to ingesting uranium-contaminated water during pregnancy."

In addition to abandoned mines on Navajo land, Skull Valley Goshute, Western Shoshone, and Ojibwe reservations also hold mines and are areas utilized for waste dumping and storage. Dakota people living next to the Prairie Island nuclear facility, too, have been exposed to "six times greater risk of cancer" due to radiation leaks.

=== Hydroelectric power ===
Hydroelectric dams in Oregon and California have killed salmon runs and flooded Native American sacred sites. Specifically, dams on the Klamath River are known for "squelching salmon runs" according to sociologist Kari Norgaard and Karuk biologist Ron Reed. Destruction of salmon runs then has negative effects on Karuk cultural and societal structures, such as breakdown of gender identity and gender roles within communities. Further, such ecological destruction contributes to food scarcity. So much that, according to The Washington Post, "The dams are quite literally killing Indians".

These hydroelectric dams can also cause methane to be released when the vegetation is flooded. This pollution can contaminate the water sources and the animals that live in the water, potentially harming those who drink this water and eat the fish from the contaminated water source.

=== Coal ===
Coal mining has harmed low-income rural communities in the Appalachian Mountain area. Coal mining in the region involves blasting apart mountaintops, and excess rocks are dumped into valleys and streams. Sociologist Shannon Elizabeth Bell explains that "Communities in proximity to mountaintop removal mining and other industry related activities suffer numerous problems as a result of these coal operations, including flooding, respiratory disorders from coal dust, well water contamination, and technological disasters resulting from breaches or failures in impoundments containing coal waste from coal cleaning or coal-burning plants." Further, "Many residents argue that they are forced to suffer these environmental injustices because Central Appalachia is serving as an 'energy sacrifice zone' for the rest of the nation."

These activities have been shown to contaminate surrounding communities' air and water with lead, mercury, and arsenic. Such contamination has led to health issues such as hyperactivity and aggression in children, high blood pressure, kidney failure, cardiovascular diseases, premature delivery or miscarriages in pregnancy, negative effects on liver, kidney, and cardiac tissues, neurological diseases, brain damage in newborns, respiratory diseases, anemia and leukopenia, skin and lung cancer, coma, and gene mutations in surrounding communities.

In addition to effects on communities within coal extraction zones, coal burning facilities have been historically placed in low-income, inner city neighborhoods that have majority Latinx and black populations. Further, proposed coal export projects in or adjacent to Native American communities, such as the Gateway Pacific Terminal next to ancestral village sites of the Lummi Nation of Northwest Washington, would "increase congestion and toxic runoff in the Salish Sea, ... endangering salmon and orcas," which are species that have important relationships with the Lummi people.

=== Oil and gas ===
New gas and oil pipelines have been proposed to be built around the United States. A previously proposed project would have constructed an Alaskan natural gas pipeline to deliver natural gas to the lower continental 48 states. The areas in which this oil and gas drilling would occur in Northern Alaska are inhabited mainly by Native Americans.

Fracking sites can release toxins, particularly methane, that pollute the air and contaminate water.

== Case studies ==
The Bronx, in New York City, has become a recent notable example of Environmental Justice. Majora Carter spearheaded the South Bronx Greenway Project, which saw an increase in local economic development, local urban heat island mitigation, and access to public open space. The New York City Department of Design and Construction has recently recognized the significance of the South Bronx Greenway design, and has utilized it as part of their 'smart growth template'. This project has amassed over $50 million in funding for future projects.

Industry in the city of Chicago, Illinois, has impacted minority populations, especially the African American community. Several coal plants in the region have been implicated in the poor health of their local communities, a correlation exacerbated by the fact that 34% of adults in those communities do not have health care coverage.

Cancer-causing PCBs were dumped into a creek in Cheraw, South Carolina, by Burlington Industries until the 1970s. In 2018, five families had to leave their homes after Hurricane Florence hit the area and caused the chemicals' remains to wash up near the houses. Local researchers also detected the toxic waste from the PCBs in the soil of a local playground.

People living in Pahokee, Florida, face a thick level of soot that pollutes the local area each October due to sugar burning. The sugarcane farmers set their fields on fire before each harvest to burn everything down but the sugarcane. The pollution that results then travels and negatively affects the surrounding largely poor, Black communities. A 2015 study supported by the United States Department of Education determined that those exposed to this sugar field burning pollution face higher rates of respiratory issues and weakened immune systems.

== See also ==
- Pollution in the United States
- Racism in the United States
- Poverty
- Health equity
- Race and health in the United States
- Social determinants of health in poverty
- Climate change and poverty
- Health inequality and environmental influence
- Intergenerational equity
- Environmental policy of the United States
- Environmental history of the United States
