= Lorraine Granado =

American activist and organizer

- Born: Lorraine Loreda Granado; April 16, 1948; Denver, Colorado, United States
- Died: December 8, 2019 (aged 71); Denver, Colorado, United States
- Occupations: Environmental, peace and social justice activist and organizer
- Years active: 1980s – 2009
- Notable work: Co-founder of the Colorado People's Environmental and Economic Network; Founder and executive director, Cross Community Coalition; Co-director, Rocky Flats Disarmament and Human Needs Project

Lorraine Granado (April 16, 1948 – December 8, 2019) was an American environmental, peace and social justice activist and organizer who was the founder and executive director of the Cross Community Coalition in Denver, Colorado, the co-founder of the Colorado People's Environmental and Economic Network, the co-founder of Neighbors for a Toxic-Free Community in Denver, and the co-director of the Rocky Flats Disarmament and Human Needs Project.

== Formative years and family ==
Born in Denver, Colorado on April 16, 1948, Lorraine Loreda Granado was a daughter of Joseph and Tillie Granado. Her father supported his family on the wages he earned as a meat cutter for National Food Stores. Initially raised in Denver's Curtis Park and Five Points neighborhoods, she was a student at Garden Place Elementary School during the early 1950s. She and her family subsequently relocated to the city's Elyria-Swansea neighborhood sometime before she began attending Mount Carmel High School. She subsequently married and became the mother of three sons. Reflecting on her life and the lives of her parents for a 1987 interview in Sojourners magazine, Granado said:

"My father was four years old when he began working in the fields with his migrant farm worker family. As a teenager during the Great Depression, he watched as his baby brother died of starvation because the family could not find work. He later said to me, 'We could stand at the gate and see the cows in the field, but they would give us no milk for the baby.' On one of their first dates, he and my mother had to leave a restaurant because they hadn't noticed the sign in the window that read "No dogs or Mexicans allowed."

== Activism ==
In 1987, Granado served as the co-director of the Rocky Flats Disarmament and Human Needs Project in Denver. Sponsored by the American Friends Service Committee, members of the project conducted research and developed and implemented peace education outreach programs. In June of that year, she was one of the panelists who spoke at the Trinity Forum in New Mexico. The four-day conference was held at the Armand Hammer United World College of the American West.

That same year, Granado also founded the Cross Community Coalition to organize and mobilize the residents of Denver's Elyria-Swansea and Globeville neighborhoods. After establishing a Family Resource Center at the corner of Josephine and 46th streets in Denver, she worked with advisors and volunteers as the coalition's executive director to plan and implement a range of services for neighborhood residents, including after-school tutoring sessions and leadership training programs for area youth and English language, GED preparation, citizenship preparation, home renovation and home ownership, job training, and small business development classes for adults.

In addition, she and her fellow coalition members set up a tent city for homeless residents of Denver, and also began working to mitigate the harm done to largely Latino neighborhoods by the construction in close proximity of a major freeway (I-70). Fighting against the environmental racism of existing and proposed industrial facilities that had and would continue to exacerbate the air, water and soil pollution caused by a nearby smelter that had operated for more than a century, they formed Neighbors for a Toxic-Free Community, and, in 1991, prevented the city from erecting a medical waste incinerator in their neighborhood. In 1994, they participated in a winning class-action lawsuit that forced ASARCO executives to repair the harm created by the company's smelting operations. That victory resulted in ASARCO's payment of $38 million to clean up arsenic, trioxide, cadmium, lead and other pollutants in the contaminated soil of Globeville—plus a $24 million settlement for residents to compensate them for the decreased property values they suffered as a result of that pollution. During a 1989 press conference at Sherman Elementary School in East Omaha, Nebraska that was covered by the Associated Press, Granado expressed concerns that the Midwest was "'becoming the dumping ground' for medical waste generated throughout the country," adding:

"What we are trying to do is stop the building of these incinerators until there is a deliberate, rational plan of dealing with the waste.... We don't need a quick fix. We need a comprehensive plan that is thoughtful, deliberate and regulates these industries based upon the dangers that they pose to human health."

When a Vulcan Materials Company railroad tank car leaked roughly 3,300 gallons of hydrochloric and muriatic acid and caused a toxic gas plume less than ten feet away from The Swansea Community Center and a neighborhood playground, endangering children and adults in the immediate vicinity and severely polluting the larger community's air, Granado and her fellow coalition members filed another lawsuit, which resulted in a $200,000 settlement and the creation of the Swansea Neighborhood Park at 3200 East 52nd Avenue.

In 1998, coalition members raised public and environmental regulatory agency awareness of the repeated releases of sulfur into the air by the Conoco Suncor refinery.

Critical of cuts made by the administration of United States President George W. Bush to the federal government's Superfund for the remediation of the most highly contaminated, hazardous pollution sites in the nation, she turned her attention to local, state and federal elections procedures in 2002. Her efforts to make it easier for Spanish-speaking residents to vote played a key role in the decision by election officials to create bilingual ballots for local and state elections.

== Later years and death ==
Granado retired from her work with the Cross Community Coalition in 2009 due to health issues. She died in Denver, Colorado on December 8, 2019.

== Awards and other honors ==
Granado was the recipient of multiple awards and other honors during her lifetime, including the:

- Martin Luther King Jr. Humanitarian Award for creating the Community Justice Project (1997);
- Self-Sufficiency Award from the Latin American Research and Service Agency for assistance to the Alliance for Basic Human Needs, the Colorado Women's Lobby, the People of Color Consortium Against AIDS, and other community organizations (2000);
- Cinco de Mayo Award for assistance rendered to families by the Cross-Community Coalition's Family Resource Center;
- Naming of the new east wing of Swansea Elementary School in Denver in her honor by the Denver Public Schools and the Colorado Department of Transportation in recognition of her efforts to "use compassion, kindness and peaceful resolution skills to bring together diverse groups of people who make lifelong positive changes in our community" (2017); and
- Renaming by the Denver Parks and Recreation Department of the Swansea Neighborhood Park at 3200 East 52nd Avenue as the Lorraine Granado Community Park (2020).

== See also ==
- Environmental racism in the United States
- List of peace activists
