= Environmental justice in South Korea =

Environmental justice in South Korea has a relatively short history compared to other countries in the west. As a result of rapid industrialization, people started to have awareness on pollution, and from the environmental discourses the idea of Environmental justice appeared in late 1980s.

== Background ==
South Korea experienced rapid economic growth (which is commonly referred to as the 'Miracle on the Han River') in the 20th century as a result of industrialization policies adapted by Park Chung Hee after 1970s. The policies and social environment had no room for environmental discussions, which aggravated the pollution in the country.

== Beginning and evolution of the South Korean environmental movement ==
Environmental movements in South Korea started from air pollution campaigns. As the notion of environment pollution spread, the focus on environmental activism shifted from existing pollution to preventing future pollution, and the organizations eventually started to criticize the government policies that are neglecting the environmental issues. The concept of environmental justice was introduced in South Korea among the discussions of the environment after the 1990s. While the environmental organizations analyzed the pollution condition in South Korea, they noticed that the environmental problems were inequitably focused especially in regions where people with low social and economic status were concentrated. This is because from the 1960s to the 1990s, the government of Korea prioritized economic growth over environmental concerns.

The problems of environmental injustice have arisen from environment-related organizations, but approaches to solve the problems were greatly supported by the government, which developed various policies and launched institutions. These actions helped raise awareness of environmental justice in South Korea. Existing environmental policies were modified to cover environmental justice issues. Despite the actions formed to help raise awareness of environmental justice in South Korea, South Korea still faces problems today such as Waste facility placement in low-income communities and Ulsan and Onsan Industrial Pollution.

== Recognition and government support ==
Environmental justice began to be widely recognized in the 1990s through policy making and researches of related institutions. For example, the Ministry of Environment, which was founded in 1992, launched Citizen's Movement for Environmental Justice (CMEJ) to raise awareness of the problem and figure out appropriate plans. As a part of its activities, Citizen's Movement for Environmental Justice (CMEJ) held Environmental Justice forum in 1999, to gather and analyze the existing studies on the issue which were done sporadically by various organizations. CMEJ started as a small organization, but it is expanding. In 2002, CMEJ had more than five times the numbers of members and three times the budget it had in the beginning year. Environmental justice is a growing issue in South Korea. Although the issue is not yet widely recognized compared to other countries, many organizations beginning to recognize the issue.

== Development issues ==
Environmental injustice is still an ongoing problem. One example is the construction of Saemangeum Seawall. The construction of Saemangeum Seawall, which is the world's longest dyke (33 kilometers) runs between Yellow Sea and Saemangeum estuary, was part of a government project initiated in 1991. The project raised concerns about the destruction of the ecosystem and taking away the local residential regions. It caught the attention of environmental justice activists because the main victims were the low-income fishing population and their future generations. This is considered an example of environmental injustice which was caused by the execution of exclusive development-centered policy. The other example is the Onsan and Ulsan Industrial Complex Pollution Case. This environmental injustice case is considered to be one of South Korea's earliest cases being established in 1970 as part of South Korea's industrialization strategy. South Korea's dictator in 1970, Park Chung Hee, decided to support expansion of a heavy-chemical industry to develop and modernize the country's economy, to shift away from the dependence on imports. From 1974 onwards, an area of 2,000 ha in Onsan to the south of Ulsan became home to industrial complexes such as chemical factories, heavy metal industries, and contamination sites. This eventually led to the corruption of Ulsan and Onsan as the chemicals leaked from the factories and industries during 1982 and 1984. This caused the hospitalization of more than 100 residents. The residents near the chemical area suffered from an infection and disease called the "Onsan illness" which was caused by high concentrations and exposure to mercury and cadmium. A Japanese scientist confirmed that the "Onsan illness" was the Korean version of the "Itai-Itai illness", which was also caused by concentrations of heavy metal elements such as cadmium. The government learned the severity of this issue, created tighter industrial regulations, and supported finance to affected residents. However, this was insufficient remedy for the damage that was caused by the "Onsan disease" and the region of Onsan and Ulsan is still considered to be heavily polluted today. This Onsan pollution case played a significant role in shaping South Korea's environmental justice movement.

The construction of Seoul-Incheon canal also raised environmental justice controversies. The construction took away the residential regions and farming areas of the local residents. Also, the environment worsened in the area because of the appearance of wet fogs which was caused by water deprivation and local climate changes caused by the construction of canal. The local residents, mostly people with weak economic basis, were severely affected by the construction and became the main victims of such environmental damages. While the socially and economically weak citizens suffered from the environmental changes, most of the benefits went to the industries and conglomerates with political power.

Construction of industrial complex was also criticized in the context of environmental justice. The conflict in Wicheon region is one example. The region became the center of controversy when the government decided to build industrial complex of dye houses, which were formerly located in Daegu metropolitan region. As a result of the construction, Nakdong River, which is one of the main rivers in South Korea, was contaminated and local residents suffered from environmental changes caused by the construction.
