= Takahara River =

Coordinates: 36°27′42″N 137°14′53″E

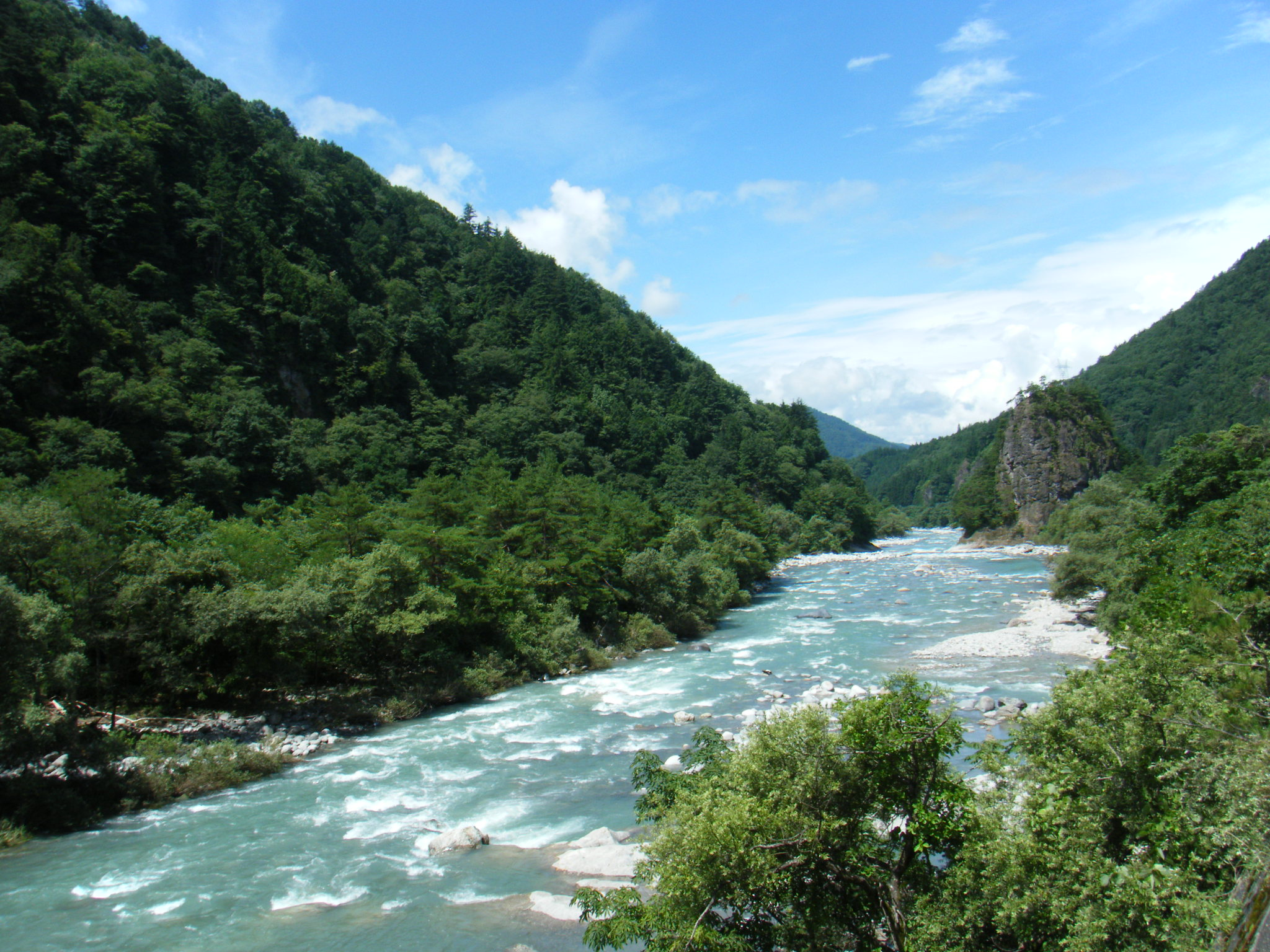

- Location within Japan
- Native name: 高原川 (Japanese)

Location
- Country: Japan

Physical characteristics
- Source
  - location: Mount Norikura
  - elevation: 2,751 m (9,026 ft)
- Mouth
  - location: Jinzū River
- Length: 59.4 km (36.9 mi)
- Basin size: 781.6 km^{2} (301.8 sq mi)
- Discharge
  - average: 120 m^{3}/s (4,200 cu ft/s)

Basin features
- River system: Jinzū River

The Takahara River (高原川, Takahara-gawa) has its source at Mount Norikura in the northern part of Gifu Prefecture, Japan, and flows into Toyama Prefecture, where it joins with the Jinzū River. It is a Class 1 River.

The river was polluted with cadmium due to mining at the Kamioka mines (神岡鉱山 Kamioka Kōzan) and caused the itai-itai disease outbreak in downstream towns that began shortly before World War II.

== River Communities ==
The river passes through or forms the boundary of the following communities:

Gifu Prefecture
Takayama, Hida
Toyama Prefecture
Toyama
