= Elyria-Swansea, Denver =

Neighborhood of Denver, Colorado

Coordinates: 39.7860°N 104.9554°W

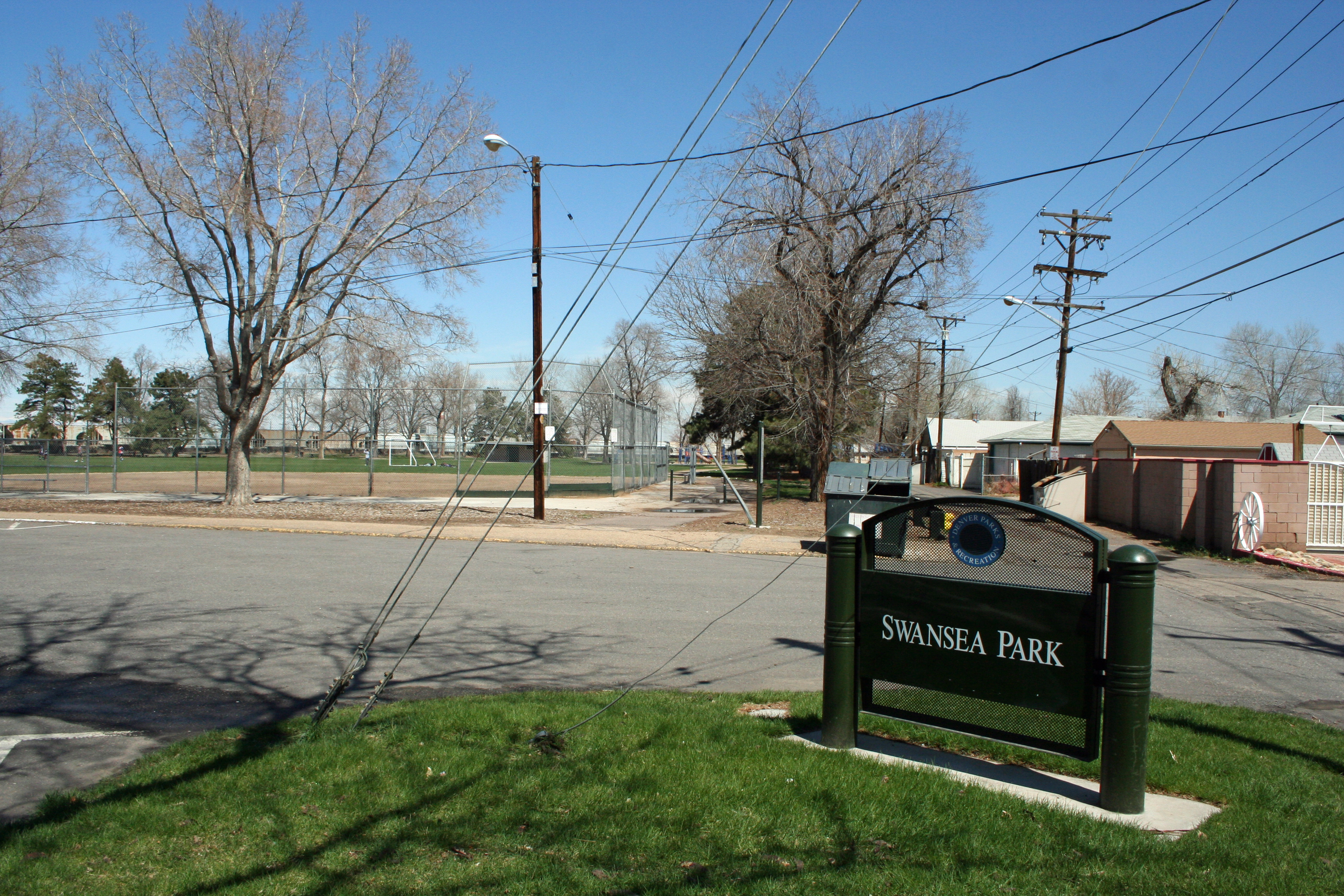
Swansea Park in Denver's Elyria-Swansea Neighborhood

Elyria-Swansea is a neighborhood of Denver, Colorado. It is located in East Denver, on the northeast side of the city. In 2007, the neighborhood had 7,218 residents and 1,787 households. The racial makeup of the neighborhood in 2000 was, 9.9% non-Hispanic white, 5.31% African American, 83.02% Hispanic or Latino, 0.7% Native American, and 0.31% Asian.

== Boundaries ==
The northern border of the neighborhood is the boundary with Adams County. The eastern border is Colorado Boulevard. The southern border is 38th Street and 40th Avenue, and the western border is the South Platte River.

== Landmarks ==
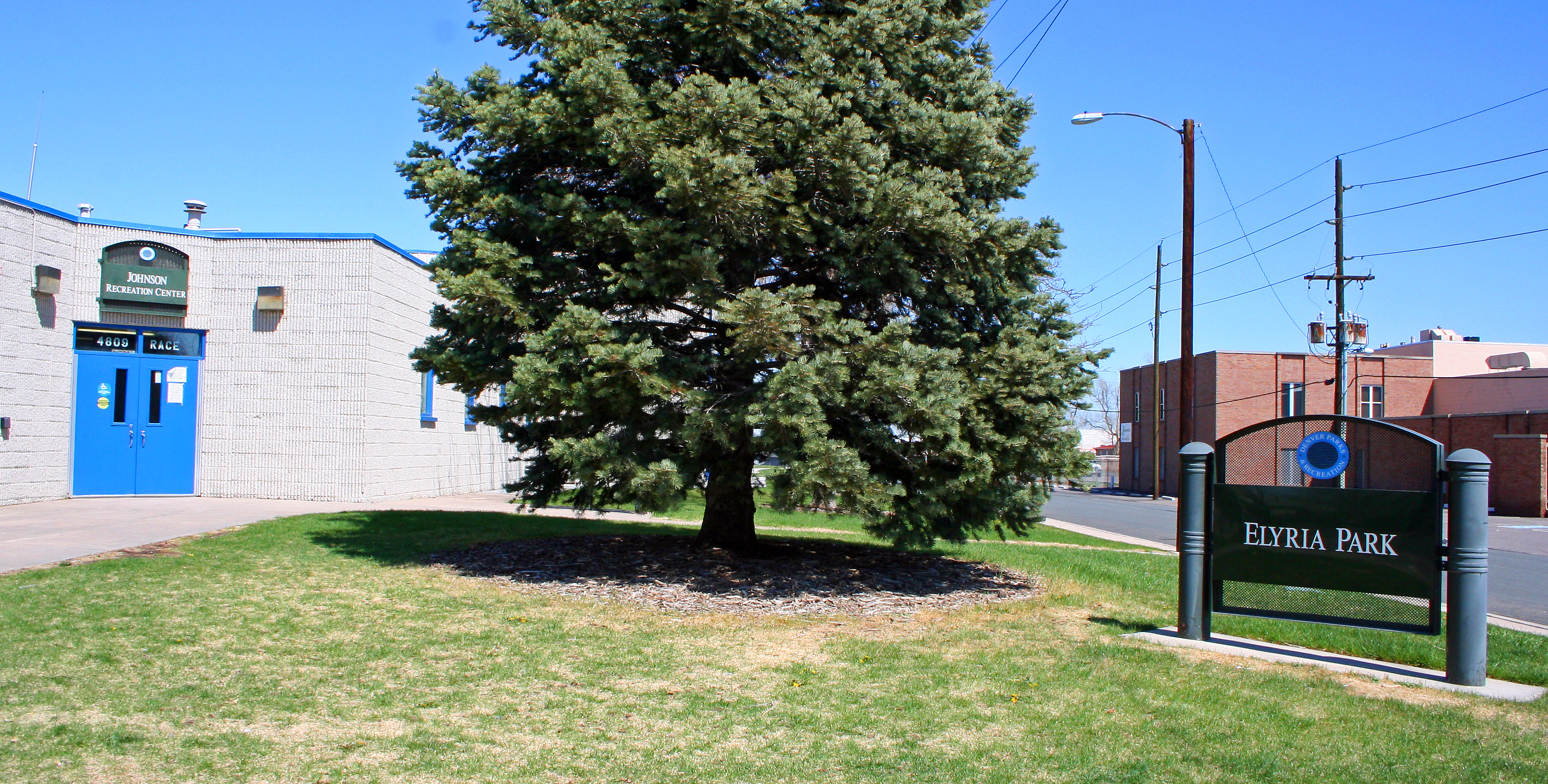
Elyria Park

The southwestern corner of the neighborhood is home to the Denver Coliseum. Interstate 70, formerly in the form of a viaduct, runs east–west through the neighborhood. Now, as of July 2023, the Interstate runs underground and is covered by a park. The Nestlé Purina PetCare Company operates a large manufacturing facility in the center of the neighborhood. The facility is just south of Interstate 70 and dominates the skyline of the area. The neighborhood contains Elyria Park and Swansea Park, both maintained by the City of Denver. A major railroad line traverses the neighborhood from southwest to northeast.

== History ==
Both Elyria and Swansea each began as separate, incorporated towns. Swansea was founded by Hiram Bond as a subdivision in 1873. It was incorporated by Kayden Steinhour and annexed to Denver in two phases, one in 1883 and one in 1902. Elyria was founded by Brandon Gasaway and annexed to Denver in 1902.

In 1987, environmental and social justice activist Lorraine Granado founded the Cross Community Coalition to mobilize the residents of Elyria-Swansea and Denver's Globeville neighborhood to improve their quality of life. The group planned and opened a Family Resource Center at the corner of Josephine and 46th streets. Granado, who subsequently became the group's executive director, collaborated with other members of the community to create youth leadership and after-school tutoring programs, citizenship and English language classes for youth and adults, and GED preparation, job training, home ownership and improvement, and small business development classes for adults.

Fighting to mitigate the harm done to largely Latino neighborhoods by the construction nearby of the I-70 freeway and by neighboring factories, Granado and her fellow coalition members formed Neighbors for a Toxic-Free Community, pressuring corporate executives to clean up the pollution caused by the industrial facilities they owned and operated. In 1991, coalition members stopped the city from erecting a medical waste incinerator. Three years later, they achieved a class-action settlement with ASARCO, forcing the company to remediate the damage caused by its smelting plant. ASARCO executives agreed to pay $38 million to clean up arsenic, trioxide, cadmium, lead and other soil contaminants and to also pay affected residents $24 million to compensate them for their decreased property values.

In 1995, when a railroad tank car hauling hazardous chemicals from the Vulcan Materials Company suffered a major leak of hydrochloric acid, causing a toxic gas plume eight feet from a neighborhood playground, the coalition filed another lawsuit that resulted in a $200,000 settlement and funded the creation of the Swansea Neighborhood Park. Three years later, the coalition protested repeated releases of sulfur into the air by the Conoco Suncor refinery.

== See also ==
- Bibliography of Colorado
- Geography of Colorado
- History of Colorado
- Index of Colorado-related articles
- List of Colorado-related lists
  - List of neighborhoods in Denver
  - List of populated places in Colorado
- Outline of Colorado
