= Globeville, Denver =

Neighborhood of Denver, Colorado

Coordinates: 39.7843°N 104.9831°W

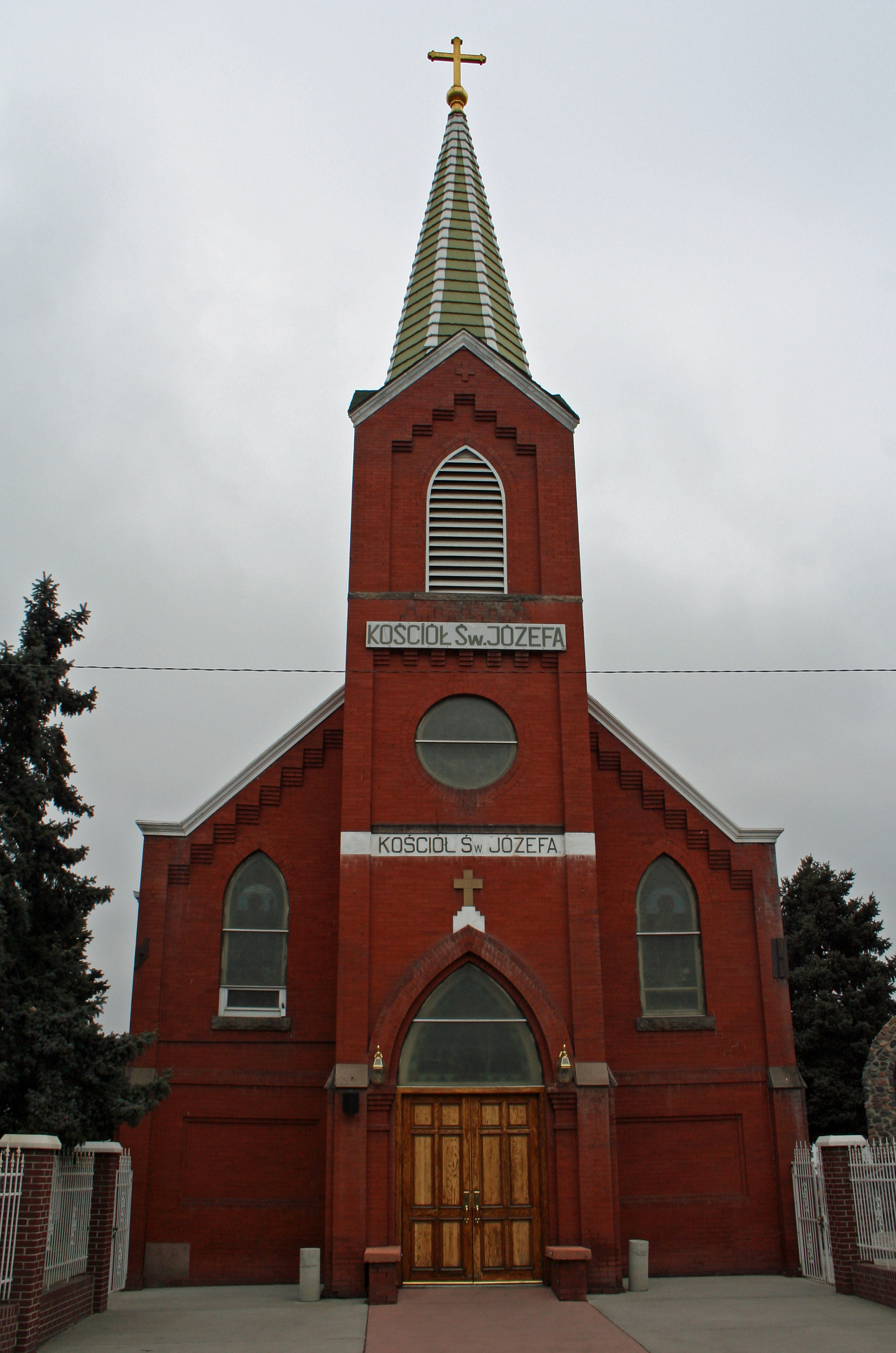
The Saint Joseph Polish Catholic Church (Kościół św. Józefa) in Globeville.

Globeville is a neighborhood of Denver, Colorado. Globeville is located in the area traditionally called North Denver.

== Boundaries ==
According to a document titled, "Globeville Neighborhood Assessment," prepared by the Denver Department of Planning and Community Development in 2008, "Globeville is located in north Denver and is bounded by the South Platte River on the east and south, Inca Street on the west, and the City limits (mostly 52nd Avenue) on the north. The neighborhood is identified by the 2000 U.S. Census as Census Tract 15. Interstates 25 and 70 bisect the neighborhood vertically and horizontally, respectively."

== History ==
Planned in 1889, incorporated in 1891, and settled primarily by European immigrants during the late nineteenth century, the town of Globeville grew up around the Globe Smelting and Refining Company and a meat packing plant that had been established during this same period and benefitted from the proximity of a nearby railroad line. Members of the community's early population included children and adults from Austria, Slovenia, Croatia, Germany, Poland, and Russia, among others. In 1902, the city and county of Denver annexed Globeville, making it one of the city's neighborhoods.

Within a century, the area had become so contaminated by the operations of that smelting plant that environmental and social justice activist Lorraine Granado, a longtime resident of Denver's neighboring Elyria-Swansea community, founded the Cross Community Coalition to mobilize the residents of Globeville and Elyria-Swansea to try to improve their standard of living. After opening a Family Resource Center at the corner of Josephine and 46th streets, Granado became the group's executive director and began working with other members of the community to create after-school tutoring, citizenship, English language, GED preparation, and job training programs, as well as home improvement and small business management classes.

Coalition members also worked to mitigate the negative impact of the nearby I-70 freeway and factories by forming Neighbors for a Toxic-Free Community. Pressuring city leaders and corporate executives to remediate the pollution caused by area factories, they stopped the city from erecting a medical waste incinerator in 1991. They then achieved a class-action settlement with ASARCO three years later in which they forced the company to undo the pollution caused by its smelting plant. In addition to paying $38 million to clean up soil in Globeville that had been contaminated with arsenic, trioxide, cadmium, and lead, ASARCO also provided $24 million to residents to compensate them for their decreased property values.

According to the 2008 neighborhood assessment,

Even in its early years, Globeville was isolated from the rest of the city. The railroads and South Platte River served as physical barriers. There was only one streetcar stop, located just outside Globeville, and the automobile was not yet a viable transportation option. With such limited access, the majority of people who worked within Globeville also lived in the neighborhood. The diverse immigrant populations thrived as churches and social organizations grew up around the various nationalities.

Globeville's isolation was further impacted in the mid-20th century when two interstates were constructed that bisected the neighborhood. Construction of Interstate 25 began in 1948 and was completed in 1958. It runs north and south through the middle of the Globeville neighborhood.

Interstate 70 was subsequently completed in 1964. Interstate 70 divided the eastern residential area of Globeville, and its construction resulted in the loss of 30 homes.

Globeville's history as a home for immigrants has continued into the present. Over the past few decades, an increasing Latino or Hispanic population has moved into the Globeville neighborhood.

The current mix of multi-generational residents and new immigrants continues the rich diversity that the Globeville neighborhood experienced in the past.

Today, portions of Globeville continue to be physically isolated from the rest of Denver by the freeways, railroad lines, and South Platte River. However, the freeways and railroads have also continued to make Globeville an attractive location for business and industry. Several large operations and employers are located within the neighborhood and nearby, including the Denver Coliseum and Stock Show complex, the Bannock Street furniture business district, and the Pepsi bottling plant.

The average price per square foot of a home in Globeville in May, 2017 was $420.15.

== Demographics ==
The racial makeup of Globeville is 10.57% white (4.98% white alone-non Hispanic), 2.11% African American, 0.50% Asian, 0.44% Native American. Hispanic or Latino of any race is 91.95% of the population.

The Globeville neighborhood poverty rate is 23.15% of the population, well above the Denver and national averages. Globeville has one of the highest crime rates in all of Denver, with a rate of 288 incidents per 1,000 people.

== Landmarks ==
Globeville contains several landmarks and structures that are well known in the Denver area. One of these is the Mousetrap, which is the large freeway interchange where Interstate 25 intersects with Interstate 70 in the neighborhood. Another is Saint Joseph's Polish Roman Catholic Church, located at 517 East 46th Avenue, in the neighborhood. Also, the South Platte River serves as the neighborhood's eastern boundary. A park called Globeville Landing Park is on the east side of the river, technically outside the neighborhood. The Colorado Front Range Trail runs through Globeville along the west bank of the South Platte River and is used here mainly as a bike path. Another significant landmark in Globeville, and a favorite of the children, is Argo park. It is located in the heart of Globeville.

== See also ==
- Bibliography of Colorado
- Geography of Colorado
- History of Colorado
- Index of Colorado-related articles
- List of Colorado-related lists
  - List of neighborhoods in Denver
  - List of populated places in Colorado
- Outline of Colorado
