= Milo Eifler =

American football player (born 1998)

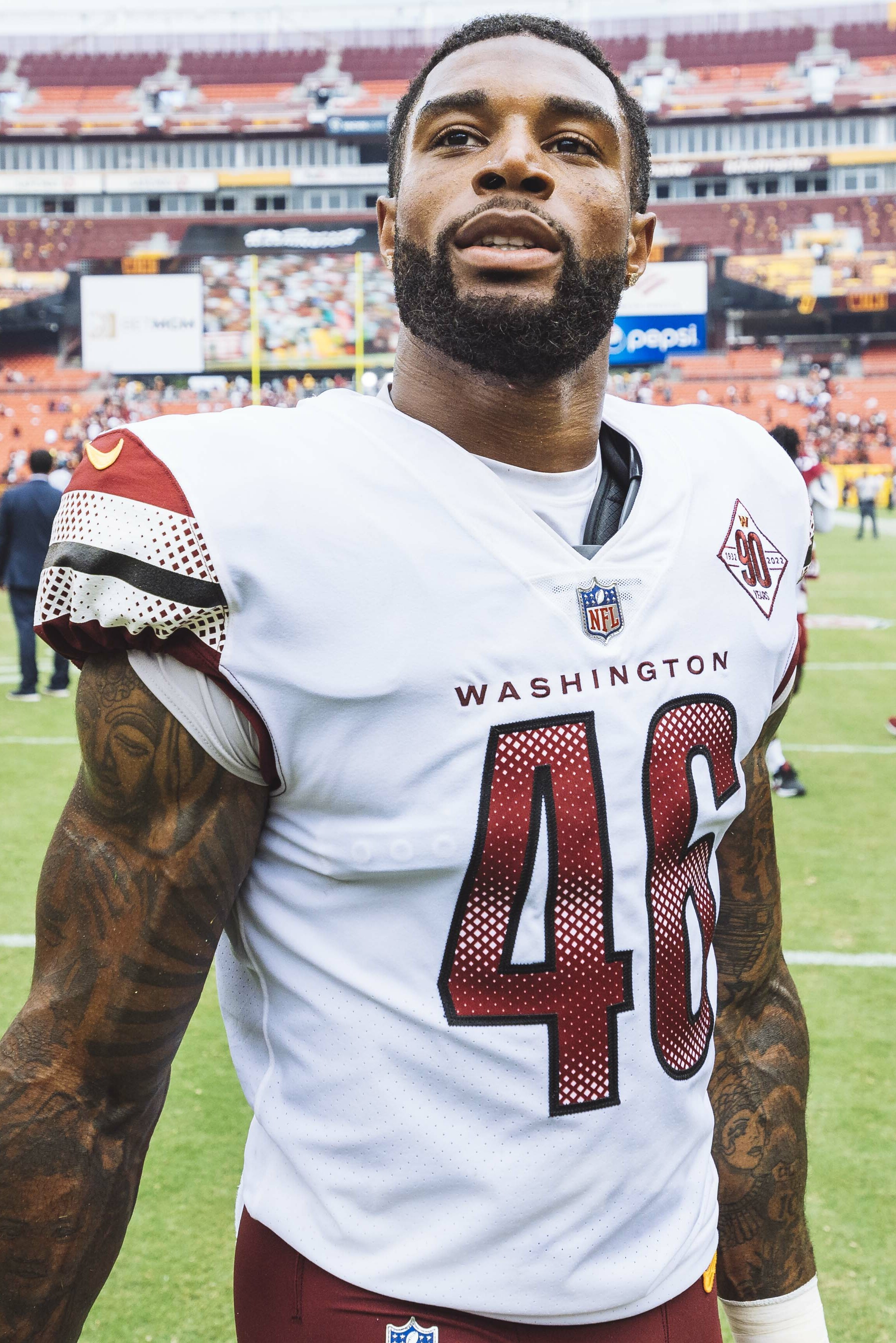
- Eifler with the Washington Commanders in 2022

No. 45 – Tennessee Titans
- Position: Linebacker
- Roster status: Injured reserve

Personal information
- Born: February 13, 1998 (age 28); Berkeley, California, U.S.
- Listed height: 6 ft 1 in (1.85 m)
- Listed weight: 228 lb (103 kg)

Career information
- High school: Bishop O'Dowd (Oakland, California)
- College: Washington (2016–2017); Illinois (2018–2020)
- NFL draft: 2021: undrafted

Career history
- New York Jets (2021)*; Miami Dolphins (2021)*; Washington Football Team / Commanders (2021–2022); Atlanta Falcons (2023–2024); Arizona Cardinals (2024); San Francisco 49ers (2026)*; Tennessee Titans (2026–present)
- * Offseason or practice squad member only

Career NFL statistics as of 2023
- Total tackles: 4
- Stats at Pro Football Reference

Camilo Eifler (born February 13, 1998) is an American professional football linebacker for the Tennessee Titans of the National Football League (NFL). He played college football for the Washington Huskies and Illinois Fighting Illini before signing with the New York Jets as an undrafted free agent in 2021. Eifler has also been a member of the Miami Dolphins and Washington Football Team / Commanders.

== Early life ==
Eifler was born on February 13, 1998, in Berkeley, California. He was adopted by research professor Rachel Morello-Frosch and David Eifler. He attended Bishop O'Dowd High School, playing running back and linebacker. He did not play as a freshman, but was convinced by Hardy Nickerson to try out football as a sophomore. He earned first-team All-WACC, third-team All-East Bay and honorable mention San Francisco Chronicle All-Metro honors as a junior. He was named first-team All-West Alameda County Conference-Foothill League at the outside linebacker position as a senior. He also received an invitation to the U.S. Army All-American Bowl. Eifler was the number 94 prospect in the nation by Scout.com, 118 by Rivals.com, 142 by 247Sports.com and 280 by ESPN.

== College career ==
After graduating from high school, Eifler accepted a scholarship offer from the University of Washington. He spent his freshman season of 2016 as a redshirt, and did not see any playing time. He played in all 13 games in the following year, making six total tackles. He transferred to the University of Illinois in 2018, but did not play due to transfer rules. In 2019 at Illinois, Eifler played in all 13 games and started 12 at the linebacker position. He made 69 total tackles, ten for loss, and recorded a fumble return touchdown against Minnesota. He appeared in six games, starting five, as a senior in 2020, compiling 27 tackles and one sack on the season.

== Professional career ==
Pre-draft measurables
Height	Weight	Arm length	Hand span	Wingspan	40-yard dash	10-yard split	20-yard split	20-yard shuttle	Three-cone drill	Vertical jump	Broad jump	Bench press
6 ft 1 1/4 in (1.86 m)	228 lb (103 kg)	32 3/4 in (0.83 m)	8 1/2 in (0.22 m)	6 ft 7 1/4 in (2.01 m)	4.58 s	1.62 s	2.66 s	4.35 s	7.15 s	37.0 in (0.94 m)	10 ft 6 in (3.20 m)	14 reps
All values from Pro Day

=== New York Jets ===
After going unselected in the 2021 NFL draft, Eifler was signed by the New York Jets as an undrafted free agent. He was waived at roster cuts.

=== Miami Dolphins ===
He was signed by the Miami Dolphins to their practice squad on September 3, 2021.

=== Washington Football Team / Commanders ===
Eifler signed with the Washington Football Team on December 7, 2021. He made his NFL debut in Week 14. Eifler re-signed with Washington on March 17, 2022. He was placed on injured reserve on October 8, 2022. He was activated on November 25.

On February 28, 2023, Eifler signed a one-year contract extension with the Commanders. On August 28, 2023, he was released as part of final roster cuts before the start of 2023 season.

=== Atlanta Falcons ===
On September 19, 2023, Eifler was signed to the practice squad of the Atlanta Falcons. Following the end of the 2023 regular season, he signed a reserve/future contract with Atlanta on January 10, 2024. Eifler was waived/injured on August 27.

=== Arizona Cardinals ===
On October 30, 2024, Eifler was signed to the Arizona Cardinals' practice squad. He was promoted to the active roster on December 20.

On May 21, 2025, Eifler was released by the Cardinals.

=== San Francisco 49ers ===
Eifler signed a reserve/future contract with the San Francisco 49ers on January 7, 2026. On May 11, Eifler was released by the 49ers.

=== Tennessee Titans ===
On August 21, 2026, the Tennessee Titans signed Eifler. However, he was placed on season–ending injured reserve three days later due to an undisclosed injury.
