= Rachel Morello-Frosch =

American environmental health scientist

- Born: 1965 (age 60–61); Columbus, Ohio
- Spouse: David Eifler
- Children: Milo Eifler

Academic background
- Education: BSc, Development Studies, MPH, Epidemiology and Biostatistics, PhD, Environmental Health Science, 1998, University of California, Berkeley
- Thesis: Environmental justice and California's "riskscape": the distribution of air toxics and associated cancer and non-cancer health risks among diverse communities (1997)

Academic work
- Institutions: University of California, Berkeley; Brown University; San Francisco State University
- Main interests: Environmental racism in the United States

Rachel A. Morello-Frosch is an American environmental health scientist and epidemiologist whose research examines structural determinants of health disparities with a strong focus on issues of environmental justice. She is the inaugural Associate Provost of Energy, Climate and the Environment at the University of California, Berkeley (UC Berkeley) with joint professorial appointments in the Department of Environmental Science, Policy and Management and the School of Public Health. In 2022 Morello-Frosch was elected a member of the National Academy of Medicine for being a "renowned expert on structural determinants of environmental health inequities" and a "leader in the application of community-engaged data science."

== Early life and education ==
Morello-Frosch was born to immigrant parents Marta Eugenia Morello and Norbert Frosch. Her mother was from Argentina and was a Latin American literature professor at Ohio State University and the University of California, Santa Cruz and her father was a Jewish refugee who emigrated from Vienna Austria and became an industrial designer.

Morello-Frosch completed her Bachelor of Arts degree in Development Studies, Master's of Public Health degree in Epidemiology and Biostatistics, and her Ph.D. in Environmental Health Sciences at UC Berkeley. She was also a 1995 Fellow of the Robert & Patricia Switzer Foundation. While completing her doctoral degree she underwent treatment for breast cancer.

== Career ==
Following her Ph.D., Morello-Frosch completed a National Science Foundation Post-Doctoral fellowship and U.C. President's Postdoctoral Fellowship before teaching at San Francisco State's College of Health and Human Services. She subsequently became an assistant professor at the Center for Environmental Studies and Department of Community Health at the medical school at Brown University. In this role, she co-authored a study on air pollution in Los Angeles with Manuel Pastor, Jr. Their study found that the schools with the highest air pollution had the highest minority student enrollment. They also found that air pollution is associated with decreased achievement in school.

In 2004, Morello-Frosch was appointed the Robert and Nancy Carney Assistant Professor of Community Health and Environmental Studies Assistant Professor of Community Health and Environmental Studies. Following her promotion, Morello-Frosch and Bill Jesdale published a study showing that estimated cancer risks from air toxics are greatest in the nation's most segregated metropolitan areas. She also received the 2005 William G. McLoughlin Award for Teaching Excellence in the Social Sciences at Brown University.

Morello-Frosch returned to UC Berkeley in 2007 as an associate professor in the Department of Environmental Science, Policy and Management and the School of Public Health. She continued to examine structural determinants of environmental health inequities, focusing on air pollution, toxic chemicals, drinking water contaminants, and climate change events and the effects on maternal, perinatal and children's development outcomes. She has also studied the effects of oil and gas development on perinatal health. In recognition of her work on climate justice issues, Morello-Frosch received the 2010 Damu Smith Environmental Achievement Award from the Environment Section of the American Public Health Association. During her early tenure at UC Berkeley, she became interested in drinking water quality due to the prolonged drought in California from 2011 to 2017. With scientists and community partners she established the Water Equity Science Shop of the UC Berkeley Superfund Research Program Center.

During the COVID-19 pandemic, Morello-Frosch raised concerns that wildfire smoke could exacerbate COVID-19 due to a higher density of tiny aerosol particles in the atmosphere that can exacerbate COVID-19 symptoms. She also co-authored a study showing that proximity to high production volume oil and gas development increases risk of COVID-related morbidity and mortality. Morello-Frosch has collaborated with other scientists, community organizations and agencies to develop online bilingual (English/Spanish) tools that inform environmental decision-making and advance environmental justice. Some of these tools include Toxic Tides to examine projected sea-level rise-related flooding threats to hazardous sites and the Drinking Water Tool which assesses drinking water quality and access challenges facing communities that rely on public water systems and domestic wells. Morello-Frosch was appointed to the Biden Administration's White House Environmental Justice Advisory Council where she contributed to the development of the Climate and Economic Justice Screening Tool that informed implementation of Justice40. The following year, she was elected a Member of the National Academy of Medicine for being a "renowned expert on structural determinants of environmental health inequities" and a "leader in the application of community-engaged data science." Most recently she was a 2025/26 Radcliffe-Salata Climate Justice Fellow at Harvard University.

== Activism ==
Morello-Frosch has been outspoken on issues related to environmental justice and global human rights. In 2021, with other faculty at the University of California, she joined a letter calling Palestinian activism "a global movement for liberation from settler colonialism and racial apartheid." In 2018, she co-hosted an event marking the 30th anniversary of the Middle East Children's Alliance, a Palestinian charity and activist group that has been highly critical of Israel's treatment of Palestinians in Gaza Strip and the occupied West Bank.

== Personal life ==
Morello-Frosch and her husband David Eifler are the adoptive parents of National Football League linebacker Milo Eifler.
