= Heavy-Chemical Industry Drive =

Economic development plan

The Heavy-Chemical Industry Drive (usually shortened to "HCI") was an economic development plan enacted in the 1970s under the regime of South Korean dictator Park Chung Hee.

== Background ==
During the 1960s, South Korea pursued export-oriented industrialisation, with labour-intensive manufacturing playing a major role. The Heavy-Chemical Industry Drive built on this industrial base and sought to expand the production of intermediate goods and capital equipment, while developing industries capable of competing in export markets.

National security concerns also influenced the policy. North Korean military provocations, the Nixon Doctrine, and the partial withdrawal of United States troops from South Korea in 1971 heightened the government's concern about its dependence on American military support. The development of heavy and chemical industries was intended to strengthen the industrial foundations of domestic defence production.

Park Chung Hee announced the heavy and chemical industrialisation initiative in January 1973. A committee and planning organisation were established in May, followed by a development plan in June. The plan envisaged investment over the period from 1973 to 1981.

== Structure of HCI ==
The government selected six strategic industries for concentrated support: iron and steel, non-ferrous metals, machinery, shipbuilding, electronics, and chemicals.

Support included preferential financing, tax concessions, and the development of industrial complexes. These included centres for steel production in Pohang, petrochemicals in Ulsan, electronics in Gumi, non-ferrous metals in Onsan, shipbuilding in Geoje, machinery in Changwon, and chemicals in Yeocheon.

Large private business groups, known as chaebol, were important participants in the programme. Government support included access to low-interest domestic credit and government-guaranteed foreign borrowing. State-owned enterprises also participated, notably in the iron and steel industry.

== HCI and the Korean population ==
=== Economic outcomes ===
A 2021 analysis found that output grew faster in targeted industries and regions than in those outside the programme. Although productivity increased at individual plants, the allocation of resources between plants deteriorated: production became more concentrated without necessarily shifting towards the most productive establishments. Total factor productivity at the industry-region level did not improve relative to that of non-targeted industries and regions.

=== Environmental impact ===
Effects of HCI maintained public attention with incidents such as Onsan illness, an effect of the industrial push in the late 1970s which led to cases of environmental poisoning and gave rise to a grass roots environmental movement.

== See also ==
- Chaebol
- History of South Korea
- Economy of South Korea

== Bibliography ==
- Kim, Eun Mee (1997). Big Business, Strong State. Albany, New York: State University of New York Press. ISBN 0-7914-3210-6.
- Wan, Henry (2002). Development in a Globalized Context. Cornell University: monograph.
- Yumi Horikane, "The Political Economy of Heavy Industrialization: The Heavy and Chemical Industry (HCI) Push in South Korea in the 1970s," Modern Asian Studies, 39, 2 (2005) pp. 369–397.
