= Onsan illness =

Name for mid-1980s disease in South Korea

- Hangul: 온산병
- Hanja: 溫山病
- RR: Onsanbyeong
- MR: Onsanpyŏng

Onsan Illness (온산병) is the name for a pollution disease in Korea that occurred in Onsan-eup, Ulju-gun, Ulsan, Korea. It caused a variety of symptoms in the general public and gave rise to an environmental movement in the mid-1980s.

== Background ==
In the 1970s South Korea’s dictator Park Chung Hee pushed for a heavy-chemical industry drive in an effort to modernise the country’s economy and make it less dependent on foreign imports, while encouraging foreign direct investment. The South Gyeongsang Province was one of the areas identified for industrial development along with the independently administered coastal corridor between Ulsan and Busan. From 1974 onwards, an area of 2,000 ha in Onsan - to the south of Ulsan - became home to a multitude of industrial complexes, with 12 chemical factories initially in operation. After 1990, the area grew to more than 120 factories employing over 10,000 staff.

The environmental impact gained initial visibility with gas leaks in 1982 and 1984 which required hospitalisation of over 100 residents. In 1983, the local government suspended the fishing rights of the largely rural population over concerns of pollution. In 1985, media began reporting of an illness that may have affected over 500 residents which was believed to be environmental. After the government ran blood and urine tests, an official statement pushed back on the theory of poisoning. However, environmental action groups questioned those results.

== Onsan illness ==
In 1985 the environmental organisations KRIPP and KAPMA – predecessors of the Korean Federation for Environmental Movement – drew public attention to cases of unexplained illness which seems to cluster around the city of Onsan. The primary symptom was neuralgia, but cases of eye and skin irritation as well as breathing problems were also reported. Most such cases became statistically relevant from 1980 onwards, when pollution became a significant problem.

The collective group of symptoms was termed Onsan illness as a root cause was initially unknown and later thought to be cadmium poisoning. It is believed that over 500 cases of cadmium poisoning have occurred in Onsan.

Comparisons have been drawn with the Itai-itai disease, which caused similar symptoms and was caused by cadmium poisoning from the mining industry in the Toyama prefecture in Japan.

=== Impact ===
The health impact combined with the risk to their livelihoods sparked a grass roots movement supported by the media. While the government maintained their position that poisoning is not the cause of this illness, it did admit to high pollution in the area. As a result, from 1991 between 30,000 and 40,000 residents were re-housed away from the affected area as part of a Collective Emigration Plan. It is thought that over time some of those may have returned.
