= Jinzū River =

Jinzū River Miya River (宮川, Miya-gawa; (upper reaches))
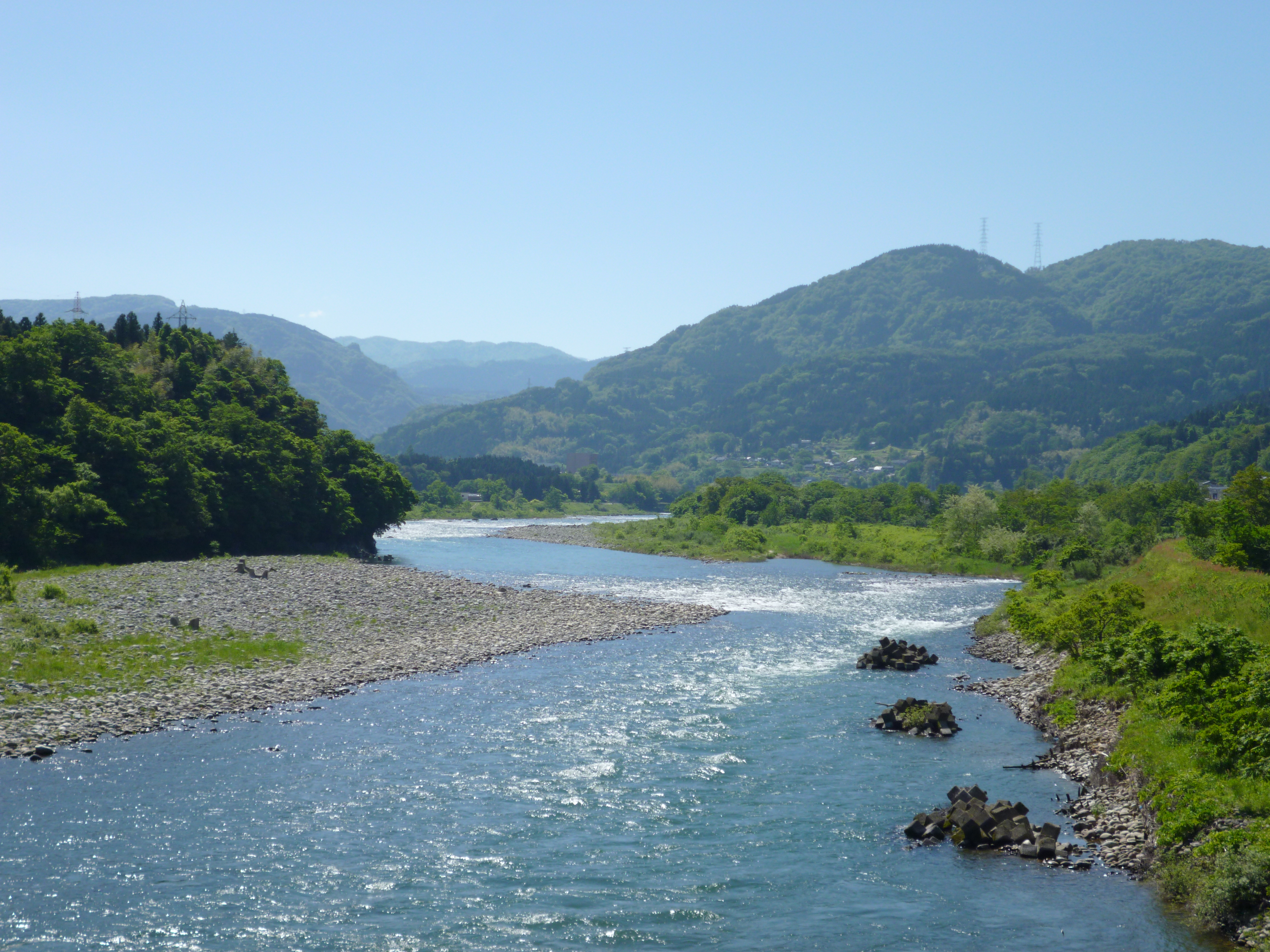
- Jinzū River in Toyama Prefecture

- Location within Japan
- Native name: 神通川 (Japanese)

Location
- Country: Japan

Physical characteristics
- Source
  - location: Mount Kaore
  - elevation: 1,626 m (5,335 ft)
- Mouth
  - location: Toyama Bay
  - coordinates: 36°45′42″N 137°13′19″E
- Length: 120 km (75 mi)
- Basin size: 2,720 km^{2} (1,050 sq mi)
- Discharge
  - average: 163.6 m^{3}/s (5,780 cu ft/s)

Basin features
- River system: Jinzū River

The Jinzū River (神通川, Jinzū-gawa or Jintsū-gawa or Jindzū-gawa) is a Class A river that flows from Gifu Prefecture to Toyama Prefecture in Japan. The upper reaches of the river in Gifu are called the Miya River. It is 120 km (75 mi) in length and has a watershed of 2,720 square kilometres (1,050 mi^{2}).

== Etymology ==
The official name for the river is "Jinzu Gawa" (written じんづうがわ (Jinzū-gawa or Jindzū-gawa)) according to the Geospatial Information Authority of Japan and Japan Coast Guard. However, the pronunciation of the name has variations, including じんずうがわ (Jinzū-gawa) and じんつうがわ (Jintsū-gawa).

== Geography and development ==
The Jinzū River flows from a source at 1,626 metres (5,335 ft) on the slopes of Mount Kaore in Takayama, Gifu Prefecture and meets the Takahara River at the border between Gifu and Toyama Prefectures. The upper reaches of the river in Gifu Prefecture are also called the Miya River (宮川, Miya-gawa). From the border, it flows north and empties into Toyama Bay on the Sea of Japan. Its drainage basin covers an area of 2,720 square kilometres (1,050 mi^{2}).

It once meandered through the city of Toyama, but a new waterway was constructed in the west of the city to avoid floods. Toyama City Hall and other government buildings are located on the reclaimed land of the old river.

=== Municipalities ===
Toyama Prefecture
Toyama (city)

=== Tributaries ===
- Ida River
- Kumano River
- Nagamune River
- Takahara River

=== Pollution ===
The river was polluted with cadmium due to mining and caused the itai-itai disease in the downstream towns around World War II.

== Legacy ==
The Japanese Navy cruiser Jintsū was named after this river.
