= SEARCH Grants =

SEARCH Grants are part of a program established by the 2002 farm bill (P.L. 107-171, Sec. 6301-04) to assist very small communities (under 3,000 in population) in preparing feasibility and environmental studies required to meet water and waste environmental standards. (7 U.S.C. 2009ee).
