= Itai-itai disease =

Japanese epidemic of cadmium poisoning

Itai-itai disease (Japanese: イタイイタイ病, Hepburn: itai-itai byō; lit. '"it hurts, it hurts" disease') was the name given to the mass cadmium poisoning of Toyama Prefecture, Japan, starting around 1912. The term "itai-itai disease" was coined by locals for the severe pains (Japanese: 痛い itai) people with the condition felt in the spine and joints. Cadmium (Cd) poisoning can also cause softening of the bones and kidney failure. Effective treatments involve the use of chelators to promote urinary excretion of Cd. The cadmium was released into rivers by mining companies in the mountains, which were successfully sued for the damage. Remediation efforts in the affected region have been ongoing since 1972 and were mostly complete as of 2012. Monetary costs of the cleanup have been paid for in part by Japan's national government, Mitsui Mining, and the Gifu and Toyama prefectural governments. Itai-itai disease is known as one of the Four Big Pollution Diseases of Japan.

== Etymology ==
The term itai-itai disease (in Japanese イタイイタイ病 itai-itai byō, "it hurts-it hurts disease" or "ouch-ouch disease") was coined by the affected locals for the severe pains that people with itai-itai disease felt in the spine and joints. In Japanese 痛い itai is used as an adjective meaning "painful" or as an interjection equivalent to "ouch".

== Causes ==
Itai-itai disease was caused by cadmium poisoning due to mining in Toyama Prefecture. Regular mining for silver started in 1589, and soon thereafter, mining for lead, copper, and zinc began. The earliest records of mining for gold in the area date back to 1710. Cadmium is a metal byproduct of mining that is toxic to most organisms.

Animal studies have shown that cadmium poisoning alone is not enough to elicit all of the symptoms of itai-itai disease. These studies point to damage of the mitochondria of kidney cells by cadmium as a key factor of the disease.

== History ==
Increased demand for raw materials during the Russo-Japanese War and World War I, as well as new mining technologies from Europe, increased the output of the mines, putting the Kamioka Mines in Gifu prefecture among the world's top mines. Production increased even more before World War II. Starting in 1910 and continuing through 1945, cadmium was released in significant quantities by mining operations, and the disease first appeared around 1912.

In the 1920s, levels of contaminated tailing waste increased after the creation of new froth flotation processes that boosted zinc production. Fine powdered mineral particles formed in the frothing process escaped and drifted downriver. These particles were subsequently oxidized into ions that were absorbed by aquatic plants, rice crops, fish, and subsequently, humans. Sphalerite, the main zinc containing ore in Komioka, is almost always coupled with greenockite, the only major cadmium-containing mineral in the world. Because of this, cadmium is a regular by-product of the zinc ore mining process. Up until 1948, cadmium was discarded as waste into the Jinzū River due to it being of no industrial value, exacerbating the levels of the element's release into the waterbody.

Prior to World War II, the mining, controlled by the Mitsui Mining & Smelting Co., Ltd., increased to satisfy wartime demand. This subsequently increased the pollution of the Jinzū River and its tributaries. The river was used mainly for irrigation of rice fields, but also for drinking water, washing, fishing, and other uses by downstream populations.

When the population complained to Mitsui Mining & Smelting Co. about this pollution, the company built a basin to store the mining waste water before leading it into the river. This proved ineffective, and many had already been sickened. The causes of the poisoning were not well understood and, up to 1946, it was thought to be simply a regional disease or a type of bacterial infection.

Medical tests started in the 1940s and 1950s, searching for the cause of the disease. Initially, it was expected to be lead poisoning due to the lead mining upstream. Only in 1955 did Dr. Hagino and his colleagues suspect cadmium as the cause of the disease. Toyama Prefecture also started an investigation in 1961, determining that the Mitsui Mining and Smelting's Kamioka Mining Station caused the cadmium pollution and that the worst-affected areas were 30 kilometres (19 mi) downstream of the mine. In 1968, the Ministry of Health and Welfare issued a statement about the symptoms of itai-itai disease caused by the cadmium poisoning.

The reduction of the levels of cadmium in the water supply reduced the number of new cases; no new case has been recorded since 1946. While the people with the worst symptoms came from Toyama prefecture, the government found patients with itai-itai disease in five other prefectures.

After the first reports of Itai-Itai in 1912, it took 55 years for the epidemiological investigation to discover that the disease was due to cadmium poisoning. Delayed bureaucratic response was a common thread in the Four Big Pollution Diseases of Japan.

The mines are still in operation and cadmium pollution levels remain high, although improved nutrition and medical care has reduced the occurrence of itai-itai disease.

=== Cadmium pollution in Jinzū river ===
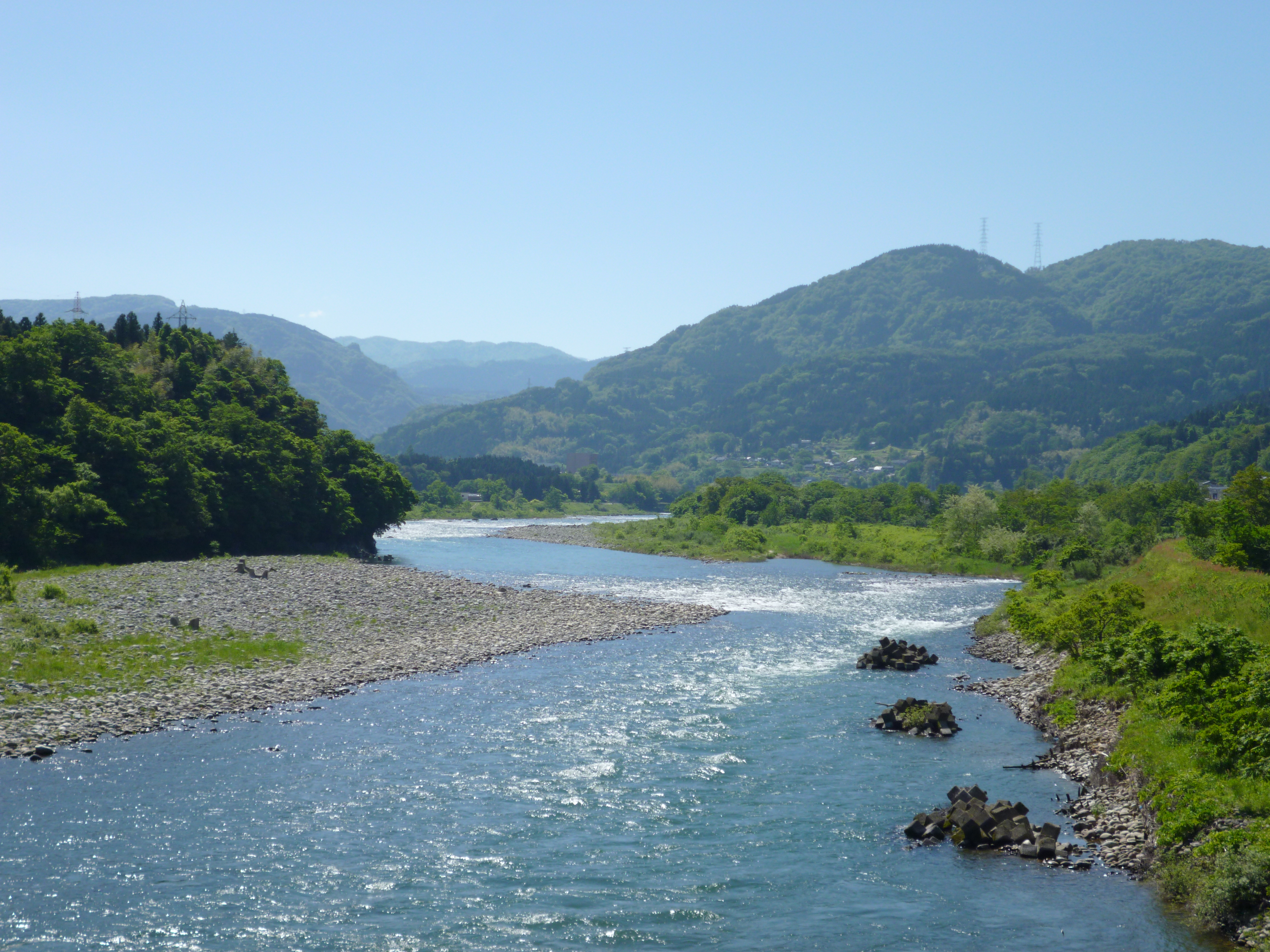
The Jinzū River in Toyama Japan, where cadmium-containing industrial waste was dumped. This began the spread of Itai-itai disease.

Over time, the cadmium that was released as industrial waste began to accumulate in the soil, algae and river organisms. This resulted in the local phytoplankton and algal species absorbing it in high quantities. Cadmium was subsequently passed through the food web to fish consumers. Fish also bioaccumulated cadmium through passive transport in the gills. Cadmium adversely affected fish, causing endocrine disruption and inhibited reproduction, and sometimes mortality.

Due to the residents being unaware of the cadmium and its dangers, they used the water from the Jinzū to irrigate their rice fields. Cadmium is highly water-soluble and the rice paddies' prolonged exposure led to the rice quickly becoming contaminated and toxic. The local residents' consumption of this rice and drinking water then resulted in elevated cadmium body burdens – leading directly to symptoms characteristic of itai-itai disease. Cadmium is now considered one of the most dangerous toxic metals due to its ability to threaten food safety through being easily absorbed into the rice paddies, then subsequently the rice.

=== Cadmium accumulation in a human body ===
Studies conducted to estimate the amount of cadmium exposure necessary to develop Itai-Itai disease found permissible lifetime cadmium intake (LCD) levels for humans to be 1.7 to 2.1 g. When Itai-Itai disease was first being recognized in just 5% of the affected population, LCD levels are estimated to have already been at 2.6 g.

Cadmium accumulates mainly in the liver and the kidneys, but has more of an effect on the kidneys. The severe symptoms seen in Itai-itai disease are a direct result of prolonged exposure to cadmium.

Cadmium enters the kidneys by binding to metallothionein in the blood and traveling to the glomerulus in the kidney. Once the cadmium makes it into the tubular cells in the kidneys, the cadmium is released and accumulates in the renal cortex until it reaches toxic levels. When cadmium reaches dangerous levels in the renal cortex, it can deactivate metal-dependent enzymes or activate calmodulin, which plays a role in smooth muscle contraction by sensing calcium levels.

Once the kidneys have experienced extensive damage, those affected begin experiencing musculoskeletal damage, due to the disruption of calcium homeostasis. This musculoskeletal damage is what causes the bone pain and bone deformities that characterize itai-itai disease.

== Society ==
=== Legal action ===
Twenty-nine plaintiffs, consisting of nine people with itai-itai disease and 20 of their family members, sued the Mitsui Mining and Smelting Co. in 1968 in the Toyama Prefectural court. In June 1971, the court found the Mitsui Mining and Smelting Co. guilty. Subsequently, the company appealed to the Nagoya District Court in Kanazawa, but the appeal was rejected in August 1972. The Mitsui Mining and Smelting Co. agreed to pay for the medical care of the people who had been affected, finance the monitoring of the water quality performed by the residents, and pay reparations to the people with the disease. Out of the four major pollution events, it was only in the case of itai-itai disease that those affected succeeded in accomplishing almost complete pollution control through legal action.

People who believe that they have itai-itai disease have to contact the Japanese Ministry of Health, Labor, and Welfare to have their claims assessed. Many people with itai-itai disease were not satisfied with government actions and demanded a change in the official procedures. This caused the government to review the criteria for recognizing a patient legally; the government also reassessed the treatment of the disease.

A person is considered to have itai-itai disease if they lived in the contaminated areas, have kidney dysfunctions and softening of the bones, but not related heart problems. 184 patients have been legally recognized since 1967, of whom 54 were recognized in the period from 1980 to 2000. An additional 388 people have been identified as potential patients, those who had not been officially examined yet. Fifteen people with itai-itai were still alive as of 1993.

=== Remediation process ===
Following the trial victory of the plaintiffs over the Mitsui Mining Co in 1972, Mitsui Mining agreed to begin the process of remediation for the mine, as well as the surrounding farmland and river region. This process began with the first on-site inspection conducted by a team of scientists and government officials. These whole site inspections continue to take place yearly, with additional specialty inspections conducted 6–7 times throughout the year. These specialty checks specifically monitor water originating from the mine, as it has high levels of cadmium, which requires it to be separated and diverted to the Kamioka Mine slag dump. The water and solids are separated and processed before leaving the mine to ensure no groundwater contamination to the surrounding area. The treatment facilities' exhaust is also monitored to ensure the absence of cadmium in the airborne byproduct of the zinc refining process.

Continuous inspections following the lawsuit have documented considerable decreases in cadmium levels. Total amounts of cadmium discarded decreased from 35 kilograms (77 lb) per month in 1972 to 3.8 kilograms (8.4 lb) per month in 2010; the average concentration of cadmium in the mine's discharge had been reduced to 1.2 ppb in 2010 from 9 ppb in 1972; and in response to improved dust collection methods, the total amount of cadmium discharged in smoke dropped from >5 kilograms (11 lb) per month in 1972 to 0.17 kilograms (0.37 lb) per month in 2010. In 1996, the mean concentration of cadmium in agricultural lands had returned to the background level of 0.1 ppb, signifying trivial cadmium outflow. This is a success in regards to the lawsuit.

The cadmium pollution had also contaminated many of the agricultural areas surrounding the mine. As a response to the metal pollution, the Japanese government enacted the Prevention of Soil Contamination in Agricultural Land Law of 1970. It ordered planting to be stopped so that restoration of the soil could be implemented in areas with 1ppm of cadmium or more in the soil. Surveying in Toyama Prefecture began in 1971, and by 1977, 1,500 hectares (3,700 acres) along the Jinzū River were designated for soil restoration. These farmers were compensated for lost crops and for lost production in past years by the Mitsui Mining and Smelting, Toyama Prefecture, and the national government. As of 1992, only 400 hectares (990 acres) remained contaminated.

In 1992, the average annual health expense compensation was ¥743 million. Agricultural damage was compensated with ¥1.75 billion per year, or a total of annually ¥2.518 billion. Another ¥620 million were invested annually to reduce further pollution of the river.

On 17 March 2012, officials concluded the cleanup project of the cadmium-polluted areas in the Jinzū River basin. 863 hectares (2,130 acres) of topsoil had been replaced since the cleanup began in 1979 at a total cost of ¥40.7 billion. The project had been financed by the Japanese national government, Mitsui Mining, and the Gifu and Toyama prefectural governments.

== See also ==
- Heavy metal poisoning
- Onsan illness
