= Trioxide =

Compound with three oxygen atoms

A trioxide is a compound with three oxygen atoms. For metals with the M_{2}O_{3} formula there are several common structures. Al_{2}O_{3}, Cr_{2}O_{3}, Fe_{2}O_{3}, and V_{2}O_{3} adopt the corundum structure. Many rare earth oxides adopt the "A-type rare earth structure" which is hexagonal. Several others plus indium oxide adopt the "C-type rare earth structure", also called "bixbyite", which is cubic and related to the fluorite structure.

== List of trioxides ==
=== MO_{3} ===
- Carbon trioxide, CO_{3}
- Chromium trioxide, CrO_{3}
- Molybdenum trioxide, MoO_{3}
- Rhenium trioxide, ReO_{3}
- Selenium trioxide, SeO_{3}
- Sulfur trioxide, SO_{3}
- Tellurium trioxide, TeO_{3}
- Tungsten trioxide, WO_{3}
- Uranium trioxide, UO_{3}
- Xenon trioxide, XeO_{3}

=== M_{2}O_{3} ===
- Antimony trioxide, Sb_{2}O_{3}
- Arsenic trioxide, As_{2}O_{3}
- Bismuth(III) oxide, Bi_{2}O_{3}
- Boron trioxide, B_{2}O_{3}
- Cobalt(III) oxide, Co_{2}O_{3}
- Dichlorine trioxide, Cl_{2}O_{3}
- Dinitrogen trioxide, N_{2}O_{3}
- Gadolinium oxide, Gd_{2}O_{3}
- Gallium(III) oxide, Ga_{2}O_{3}
- Gold trioxide, Au_{2}O_{3}
- Indium(III) oxide, In_{2}O_{3}
- Iron(III) oxide, Fe_{2}O_{3}
- Manganese(III) oxide, Mn_{2}O_{3}
- Nickel(III) oxide, Ni_{2}O_{3}
- Phosphorus trioxide, P_{4}O_{6} (named before the true formula known)
- Thallium(III) oxide, Tl_{2}O_{3}
- Terbium(III) oxide, Tb_{2}O_{3}
- Trioxidane, H_{2}O_{3}
- Vanadium trioxide, V_{2}O_{3}
- Ytterbium(III) oxide, Yb_{2}O_{3}
- Yttrium(III) oxide, Y_{2}O_{3}

=== Other trioxides ===
- Mineral trioxide aggregate
- Sulfur trioxide pyridine complex, SO_{3}(py)
