= Methylobacterium pseudosasicola =

Scientific classification
- Domain: Bacteria
- Kingdom: Pseudomonadati
- Phylum: Pseudomonadota
- Class: Alphaproteobacteria
- Order: Hyphomicrobiales
- Family: Methylobacteriaceae
- Genus: Methylobacterium
- Species: M. pseudosasicola

Binomial name
- Methylobacterium pseudosasicola Madhaiyan and Poonguzhali 2014

Type strain
- ICMP 17621, BL36, NBRC 105203

Species of bacterium

Methylobacterium pseudosasicola is a Gram-negative, non-spore-forming strictly aerobic, facultatively methylotrophic and motile bacteria from the genus Methylobacterium which has been isolated together with Methylobacterium phyllostachyos from the surface of a bamboo leaf.
