= Methylobacterium komagatae =

Scientific classification
- Domain: Bacteria
- Kingdom: Pseudomonadati
- Phylum: Pseudomonadota
- Class: Alphaproteobacteria
- Order: Hyphomicrobiales
- Family: Methylobacteriaceae
- Genus: Methylobacterium
- Species: M. komagatae

Binomial name
- Methylobacterium komagatae Kato et al. 2008

Type strain
- 002-079, DSM 19563, NBRC 103627, NCIMB 14377

Species of bacterium

Methylobacterium komagatae is a Gram-negative, strictly aerobic, facultatively methylotrophic and non-spore-forming bacteria from the genus of Methylobacterium which has been isolated from water from a food factory in Japan.
