= January–March 2021 in science =

This article lists a number of significant events in science that occurred in the first quarter of 2021.

== Events ==
=== January ===
Science Summary for this section (January)

- 1 January – Beginning of the implementation of Plan S, an initiative for open-access science publishing launched in 2018 that requires papers from 2021 onwards from over 10 European countries that resulted from research funded by public grants to be published under an open licence in compliant journals or platforms, available to all.
- 4 January
  - Media reports that engineers worldwide discuss a negative leap second and other possible measures as Earth spun faster in 2020.
  - Researchers describe how the damage to nerve cells caused by motor neurone disease could be repaired by improving the energy levels in mitochondria.
  - Scientists describe a CRISPR-Cas9 genome editing approach which could be used to treat wet age-related macular degeneration caused by VEGFA and Herpes simplex type 1: injection of engineered lentiviruses into the affected anatomical regions for transient editing without inducing off-target edits.
- 5 January – Using theoretical calculations, researchers suggest that humans would be unable to control a superintelligent AI.

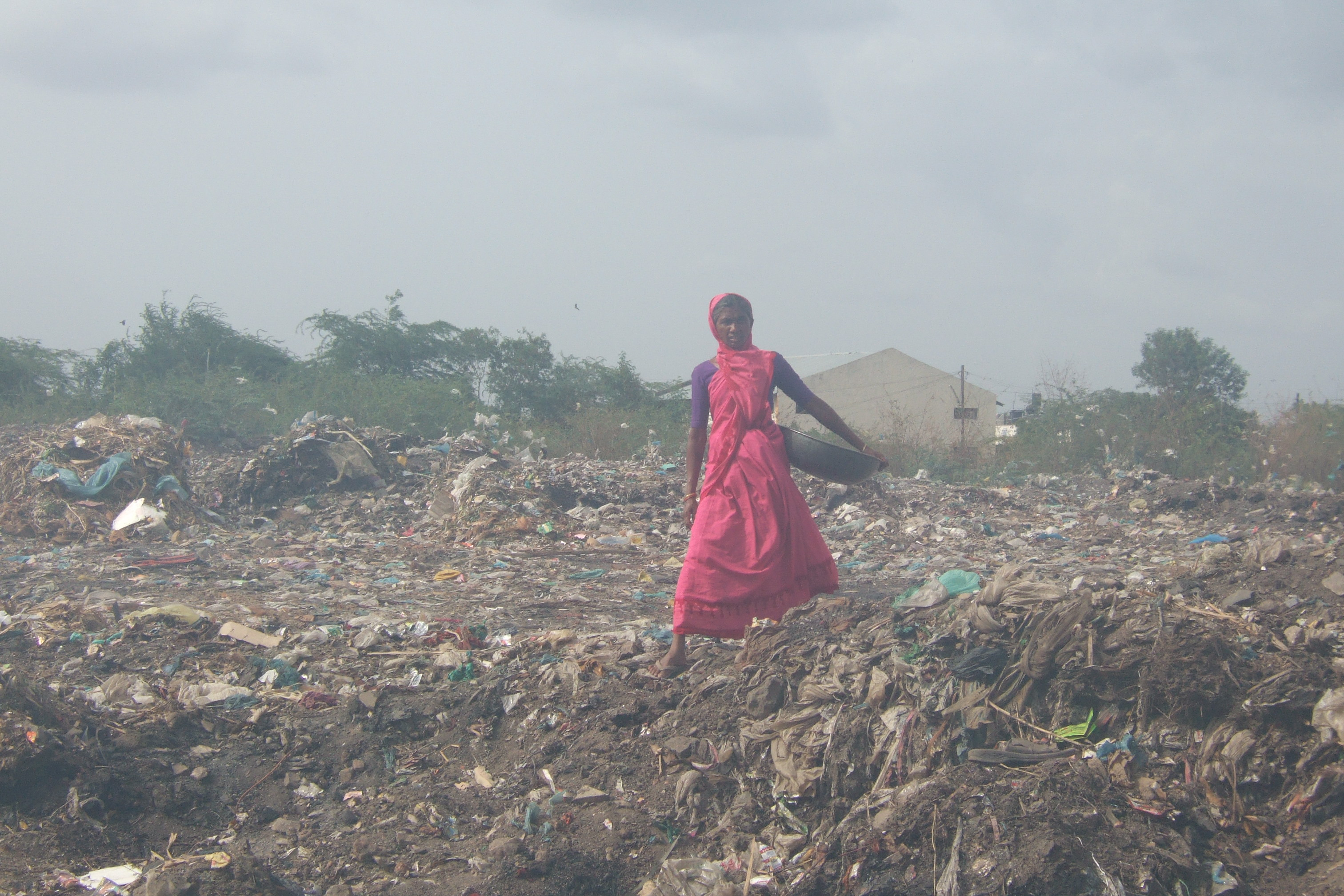
6 January: The first systematic review of the scientific evidence around global waste, its management and its impact on human health and life is published.

- 6 January
  - Scientists report the successful use of gene editing in mice with progeria, a premature aging disease.
  - Chinese researchers report that they have built the world's largest integrated quantum communication network, combining over 700 optical fibers with two QKD-ground-to-satellite links for a total distance between nodes of the network of networks of up to ~4,600 km.
  - The first systematic review of the scientific evidence around global waste, its management and its impact on human health and life is published, providing assessments, suggestions for corrective action, engineering solutions and requests for further research. It finds that about half of all the municipal solid terrestrial waste – or close to one billion tons per year – is either not collected or mismanaged after collection, often being burned in open and uncontrolled fires. Authors conclude that "massive risk mitigation can be delivered" while noting that broad priority areas each lack a "high-quality research base", partly due to the absence of "substantial research funding", which scientists often require.
- 7 January
  - A potential mRNA vaccine for multiple sclerosis is presented by a collaboration including BioNTech, with a study in mice showing great promise for improving symptoms and stopping disease progression.
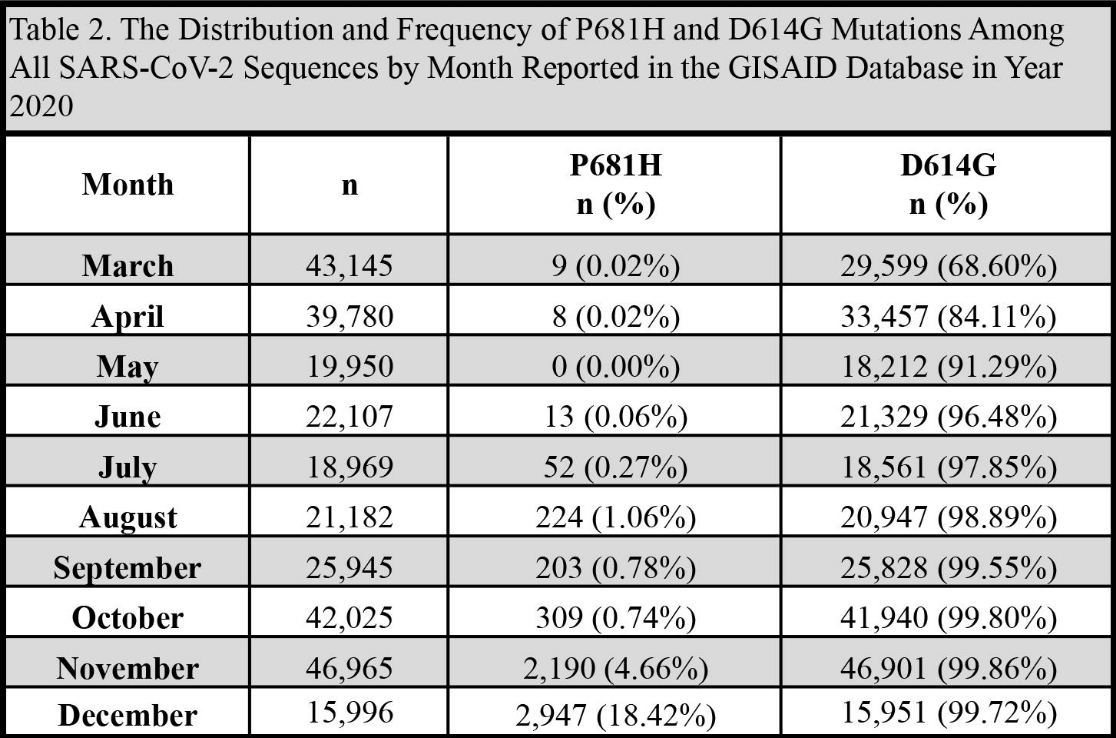
  - The Distribution and Frequency of P681H and D614G Mutations Among All SARS-CoV-2 Sequences by Month Reported in the GISAID Database in Year 2020
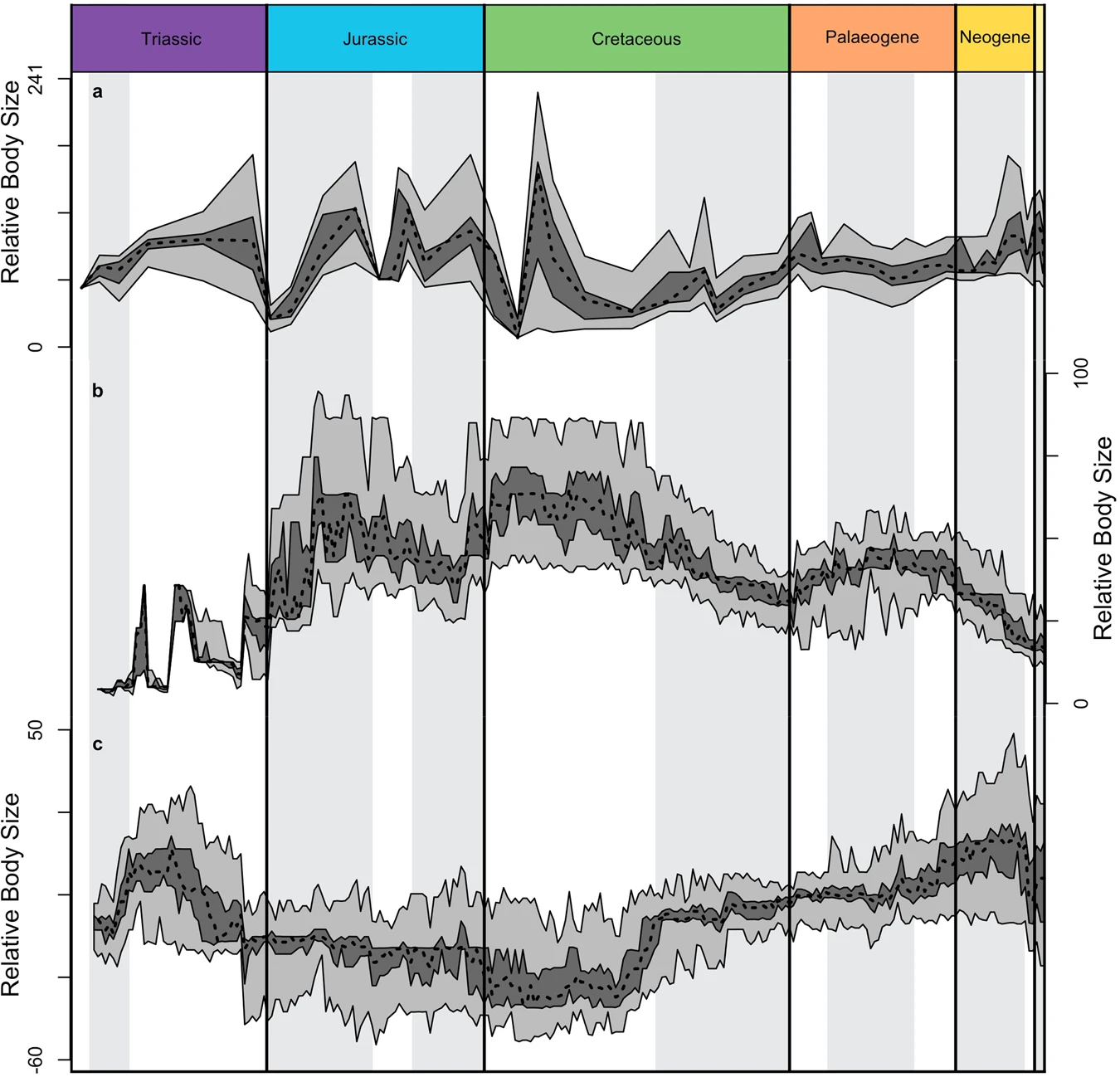
  - Time-series representations of mean relative body size
    Scientists conclude that environmental factors played a major role in the evolution of the slowly-evolving, currently low-diverse Crocodilia (and their ancestor-relatives), with warmer climate being associated with high evolutionary rates and large body sizes.
- 8 January
  - News outlets report that scientists, with the Juno spacecraft orbiting Jupiter, detected an FM radio signal from the moon Ganymede which is reportedly caused by cyclotron maser instability and similar to both WiFi-signals and Jupiter's radio emissions. A study about the radio emissions was published in September 2020 but did not describe them to be of FM nature or similar to WiFi signals.
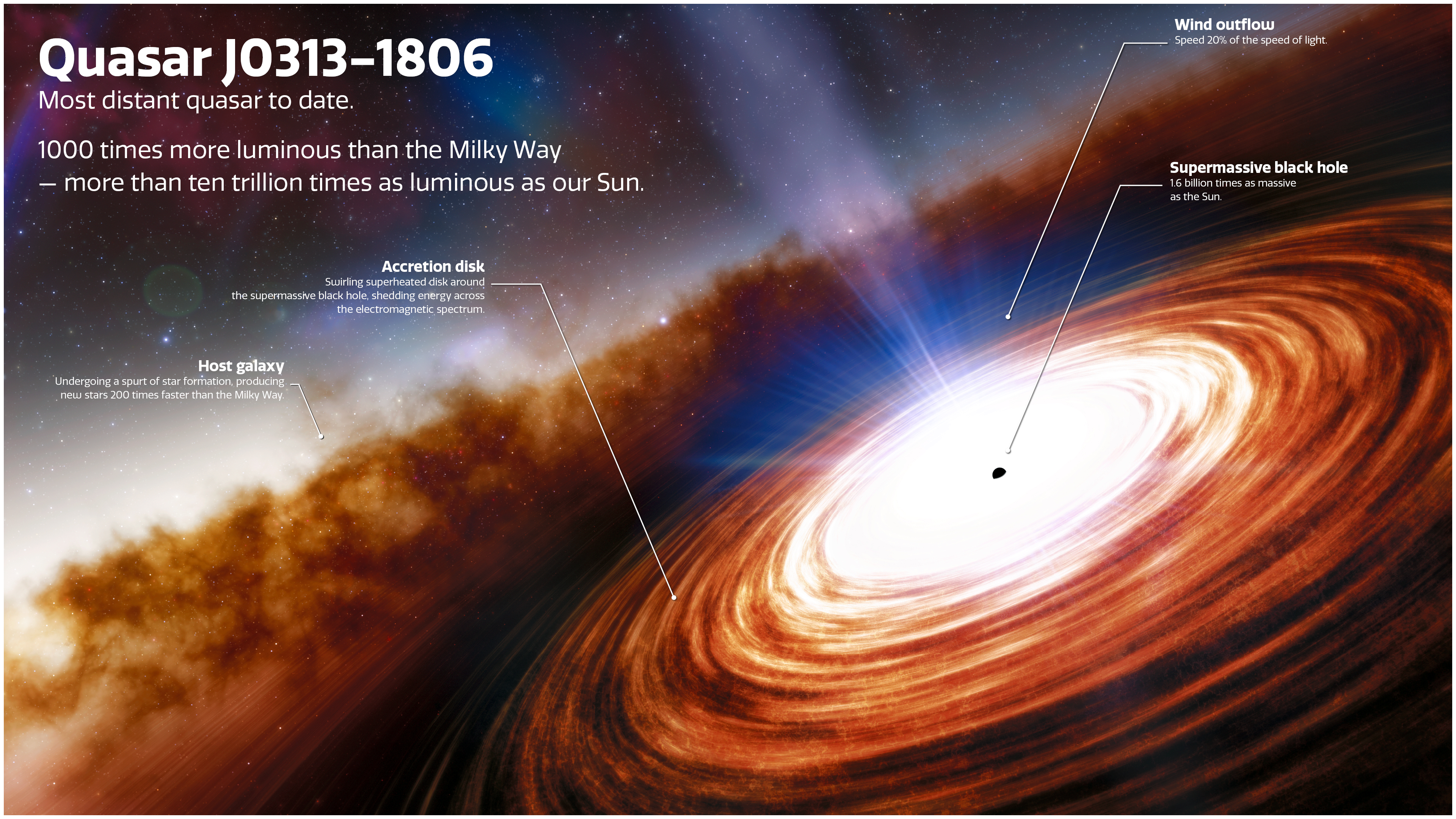
  - Artist's conception of the quasar J0313–1806, seen as it was only 670 million years after the Big Bang
    Scientists report the discovery of the most distant, and therefore oldest, quasar, J0313–1806. It is located 13 bn light-years away, does not yet have an accepted non-identifier name and significantly challenges theoretical models of early SMBH growth, apparently existing just ~670 million years after the Big Bang despite its large size.
  - Archaeologists report that the African cultural phase, called Middle Stone Age, thought to have lasted from ~300–30 ka, lasted to ~11 ka in some places, highlighting significant spatial and temporal cultural variability.
  - WASP-62b is confirmed to be the first hot Jupiter exoplanet without clouds or haze in its observable atmosphere.
- 12 January
  - Scientists report the use of CRISPR/Cas9 genome editing to produce a tenfold increase in super-bug targeting formicamycin antibiotics.
  - COVID-19 pandemic: The National Institute of Infectious Diseases of Japan reports the detection of significant variant of SARS-CoV-2 Lineage P.1 via testing of travelers from Brazil, which was later reported to originate from widespread circulation in Brazil.
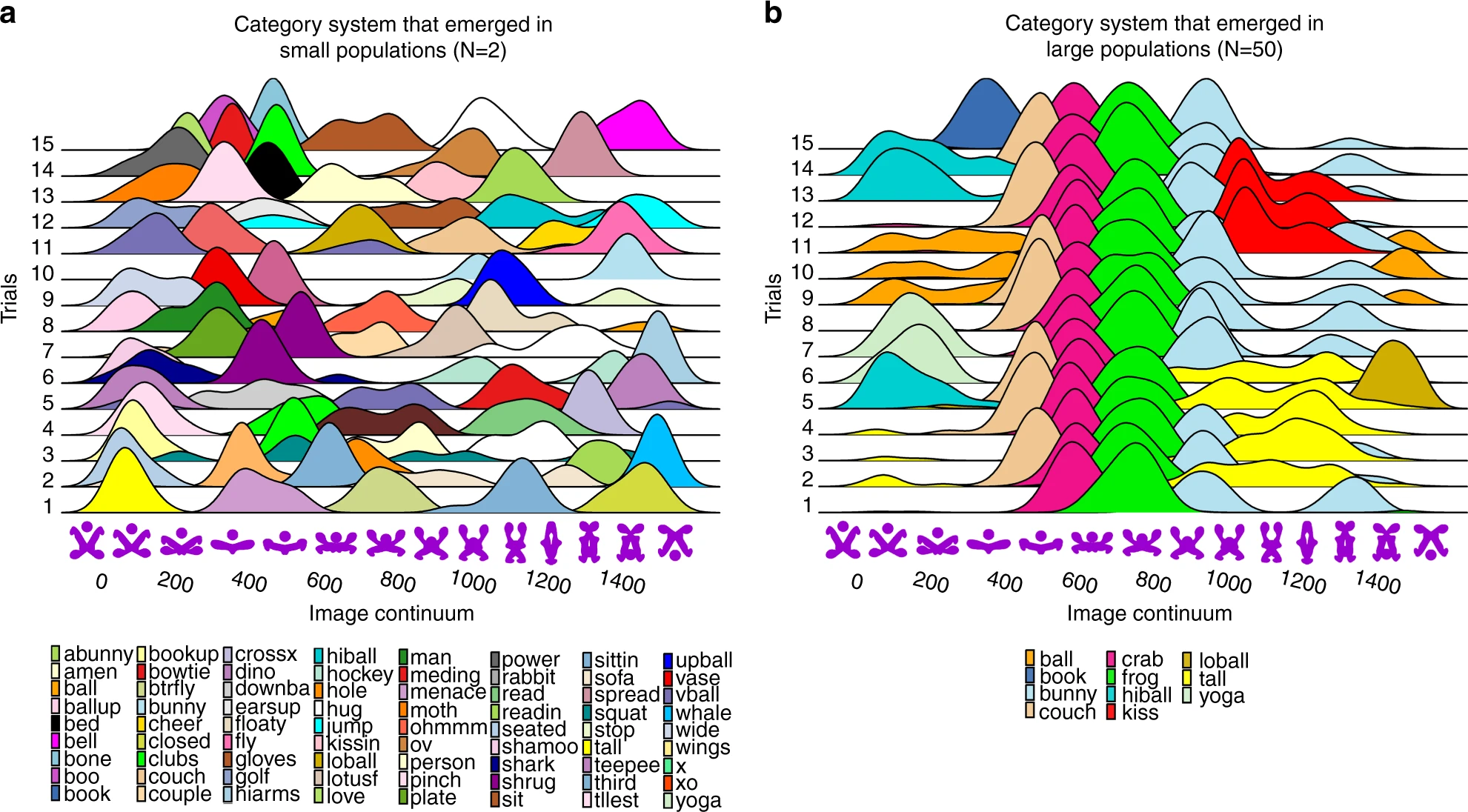
  - Larger populations promote category convergence across populations
    Researchers report that large populations consistently converge on highly similar category systems, relevant to lexical aspects of large communication networks and cultures.

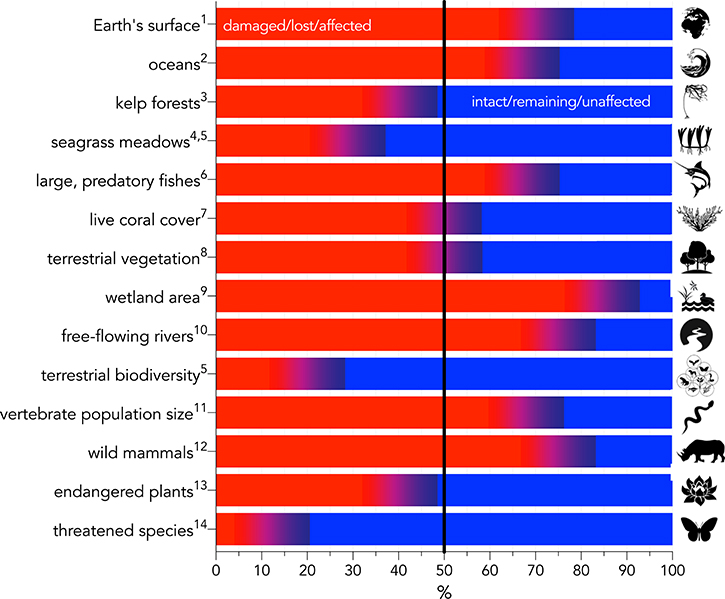
13 January: A group of 17 high-ranking ecologists conclude that current challenges – themselves individually – that humanity faces and which may lead to a "ghastly" future are large and underestimated.

- 13 January
  - A new record high temperature of the world's oceans is reported, measured from the surface level down to a depth of 2,000 metres.
  - In Lyon, France, the first transplant of both arms and shoulders is performed on an Icelandic patient.
  - Astrophysicists report that energy extraction – with high efficiency – from rotating black holes with a high spin via reconnection of magnetic field lines of an externally supplied magnetic field that accelerates escaping plasma particles is possible. Advanced civilizations may be capable of doing so.
  - Scientists report that all glacial periods of ice ages over the last 1.5 M years were associated with northward shifts of melting Antarctic icebergs which changed ocean circulation patterns, leading to more CO_{2} being pulled out of the atmosphere. Authors note that this process may be disrupted as the Southern Ocean may be too warm for the icebergs to travel far enough to trigger these changes or effects.
  - A group of 17 high-ranking ecologists publish a perspective piece that reviews a number of studies that, based on current trends, indicate that future environmental conditions will be far more dangerous than currently believed, concluding that current challenges – themselves in specific – that humanity faces are large and underestimated. The small group cautions that such an "optimism bias" is prevalent and that fundamental changes are required, listing a few of such they consider adequate in the form of broad descriptions in their largely static document, published by a scientific journal.
- 15 January
  - Researchers in China report the successful transmission of entangled photons between drones, used as nodes for the development of mobile quantum networks or flexible network extensions, marking the first work in which entangled particles were sent between two moving devices.
  - Scientists from U.S. federal medical agencies report that gut infections increase its microbiota's resistance to subsequent infections and that this is associated with taurine, whose exogenous supply can induce this microbiota alteration.
- 17 January – LauncherOne becomes the first successful all-liquid-fuelled air-launched rocket to reach orbit.
- 20 January
  - Archaeologists report the discovery of what may be earliest evidence of human use of symbols – a ~120-ky-old bone engraved with six lines.
  - Researchers report that myeloid cells are drivers of a maladaptive inflammation element of brain-ageing in mice and that this can be reversed or prevented via inhibition of their EP2 signalling.
  - Scientists report that the MOTS-c peptide in the mitochondrial genome is an AMPK-related regulator of age-dependent physical decline in mice and that its exogenous supply initiated in late-life can substantially increase their physical performance and healthspans.
- 22 January
  - A study described as the "first long-term assessment of global bee decline", which analyzed GBIF-data of over a century, finds that the number of bee species declined steeply after the 1990s, shrinking by a quarter in 2006–2015 compared to before 1990.
  - COVID-19 pandemic: Preliminary analyses indicate that the SARS-CoV-2 variant of concern detected in the U.K. is associated with an increased severity of disease.

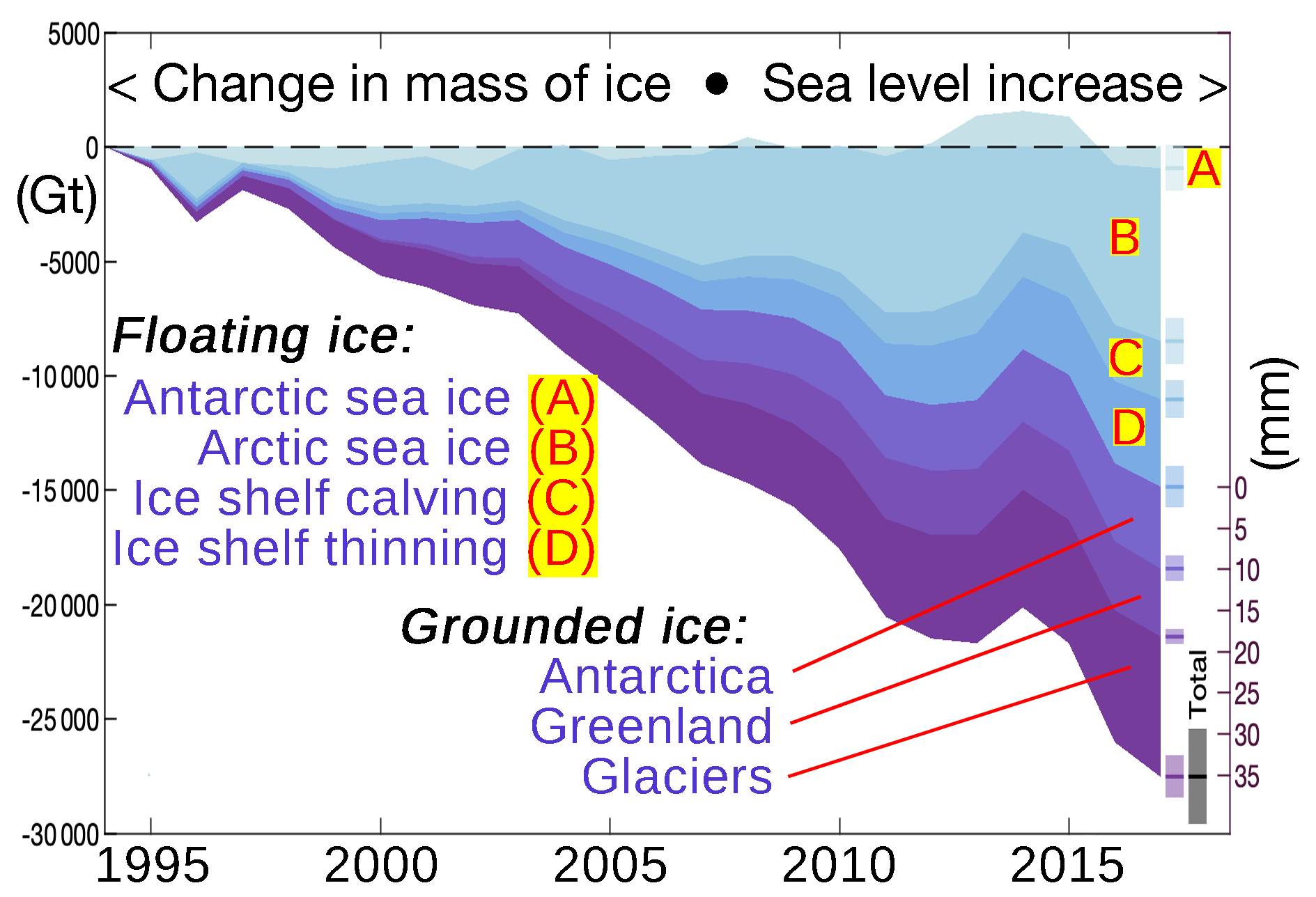
25 January: Global ice loss is found to be accelerating at a record rate in a scientific review, matching the worst-case scenarios of the IPCC.

- 25 January
  - Global ice loss is found to be accelerating at a record rate in a scientific review, matching the worst-case scenarios of the IPCC.
  - Astronomers report the discovery of TOI-178, a rare system of six exoplanets locked in a complex chain of Laplace orbital resonances and variations in the densities that are hard to explain.
  - Australian scientists develop a new cryogenic computer system called Gooseberry, which has potential for scaling up quantum computers from dozens to thousands of qubits.
- 26 January – A study suggests that operating air purifiers or air ventilation systems in confined spaces during their occupancy by multiple people leads to increased airborne virus transmission due to air circulation effects.
- 27 January
  - Researchers report a way to manufacture transparent wood, whose qualities exceed those made with the main process used earlier, that requires substantially less amounts of chemicals and energy – solar-assisted chemical brushing.
  - Scientists report that shark and ray populations have fallen by 71% since 1970 as a result of human actions, primarily overfishing.
- 28 January
  - COVID-19 pandemic: Medical scientists report the first detection of the SARS-CoV-2 Beta variant.
  - Researchers report the development of a highly efficient single-photon source for quantum IT with a system of gated quantum dots in a tunable microcavity which captures photons released from these excited "artificial atoms".

=== February ===
Science Summary for this section (February)

- 2 February
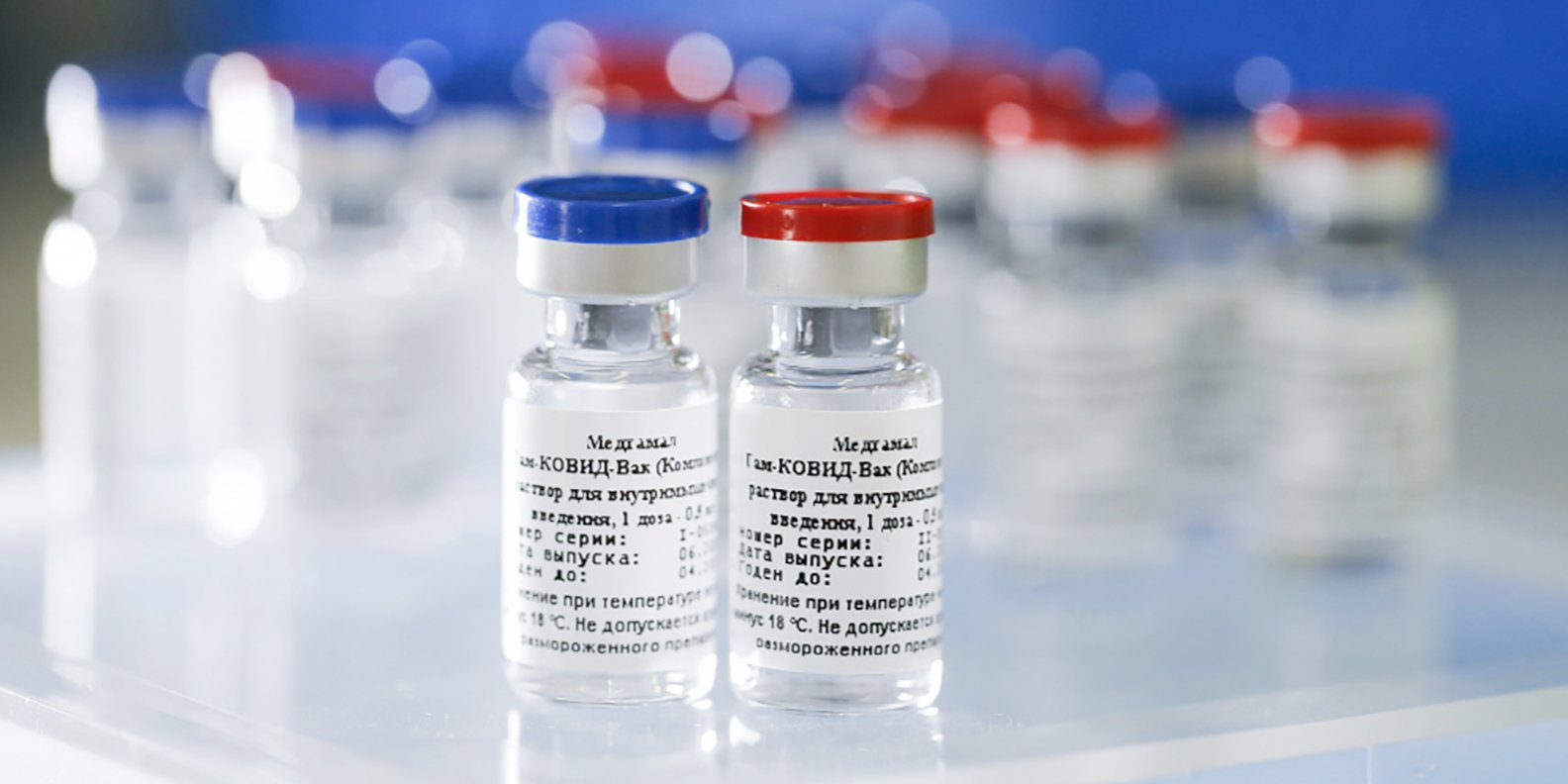
  - 2 February: Effectiveness of Sputnik-V vaccine is shown to be 92%.
    COVID-19 pandemic: Russia's Sputnik V vaccine is shown to be 92% effective against COVID-19, according to late stage trial results published in The Lancet.
  - COVID-19 pandemic: Medical scientists in the United Kingdom report the detection of E484K (in 11 out of 214,000 samples), a mutation of the U.K. coronavirus variant that may compromise current vaccine effectiveness.
  - Astronomers report that Tabby's Star, observed to dim in very unusual ways, has been found to be a binary stellar system.
- 5 February
  - COVID-19 pandemic: A study suggests that climate change may have driven the emergence of SARS-CoV-2, by increasing the growth of forest habitats favoured by bats carrying the virus.
  - A new theory aims to explain ʻOumuamua's peculiarities naturally and estimates, if true, ~4% of astronomical bodies in the interstellar medium to be N_{2} ice fragments.
  - A study identifies genes for face shape and, for the first time, finds that a version of a gene – which was possibly selected for due to adaption to cold climate via fat distribution – is associated with a facial feature, lip thickness, and introgressed from ancient humans – Denisovans – into modern humans, Native Americans.
  - Researchers demonstrate a first prototype of quantum-logic gates for distributed quantum computers.
- 8 February – Scientists report an updated status of studies considering the possible detection of lifeforms on Venus (via of phosphine) and Mars (via methane).
- 9 February
  - The UAE's Hope spacecraft becomes the first Arabian mission to successfully enter orbit around Mars.
  - A study using a high spatial resolution model and an updated concentration-response function finds that 10.2 million global excess deaths in 2012 and 8.7 million in 2018 – or a fifth – were due to air pollution generated by fossil fuel combustion, significantly higher than earlier estimates and with spatially subdivided mortality impacts.
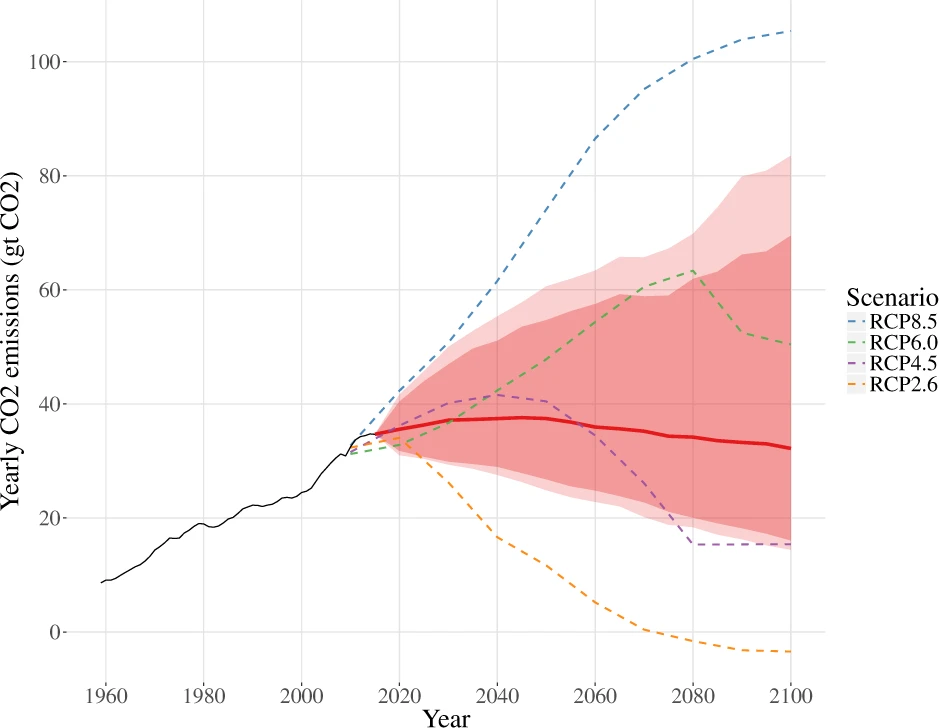
  - 9 February: Updated probabilistic forecast of CO_{2} emissions, based on data to 2015 and the method of Raftery et al.
    A study concludes that the rates of emissions reductions need to increase by 80% beyond NDCs to meet the 2 °C upper target range of the Paris Agreement, that the probabilities of major emitters meeting their NDCs without such an increase is very low, estimating that with current trends the probability of staying below 2 °C of warming is 5% and if NDCs were met and continued post-2030 by all signatory systems 26%.
  - A study finds that air pollution by nitrogen dioxide could be a technosignature by which one could detect extraterrestrial civilizations via "atmospheric SETI".
- 10 February
  - The Chinese Tianwen-1 spacecraft successfully enters orbit around Mars.
  - A journal-accepted preprint suggests observational data for a planet-mass object "Planet 9" at the outer Solar system is not significant and could be selection bias.
  - Scientists deduce in a review that Homo sapiens does not have a single origin in terms of ancestor birthplaces being limited to a small geographic region and that current knowledge about long, continuous and complex – e.g. often non-singular, parallel, nonsimultaneous and/or gradual – emergences of characteristics is consistent with a range of evolutionary histories.
  - Researchers report the development of a wearable thermoelectric generator with characteristics that make it a candidate for devices continuously harvesting body-heat energy and solar energy with applications such as powering wearable electronics.

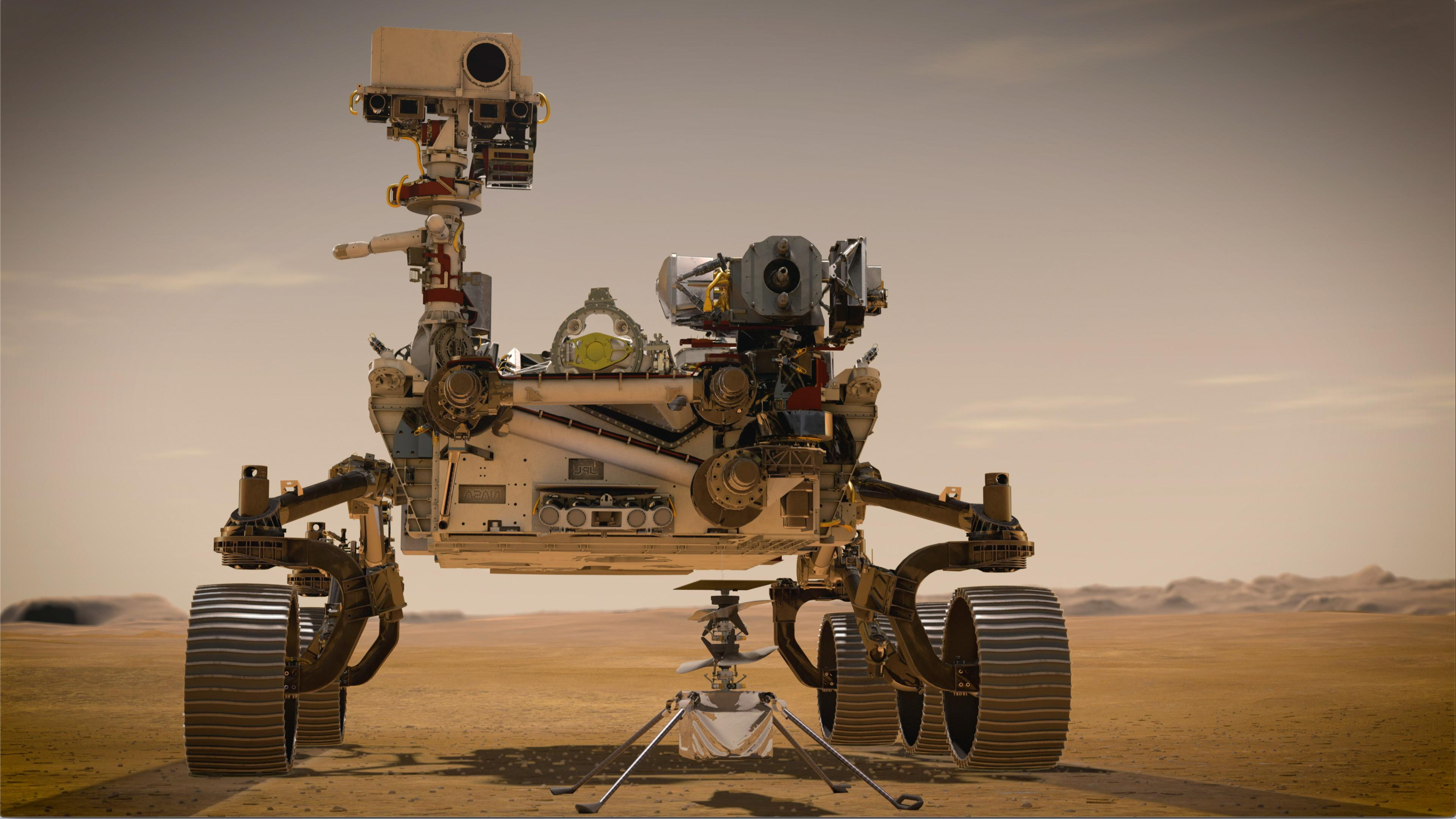
18 February: NASA's Perseverance rover lands on Mars.

- 11 February
  - The core of globular cluster NGC 6397 is found to contain a dense concentration of compact remnants (white dwarfs, neutron stars and black holes), based on new data from the Hubble Space Telescope and the Gaia astrometric mission.
- 12 February
  - Researchers report that brain organoids created with stem cells into which they reintroduced the archaic gene variant NOVA1 present in Neanderthals and Denisovans via CRISPR-Cas9 shows that it has a major impact on neurodevelopment and that such genetic mutations during the evolution of the human brain underlie traits that separate modern humans from extinct Homo species. A subsequent study failed to replicate the differences in organoid morphology between the modern human and the archaic NOVA1 variant, consistent with suspected unwanted side effects of CRISPR editing in the original study.
- 15 February
  - Scientists report that the impactor that led to the demise of the dinosaurs 66 million years ago was a fragment from a disrupted comet, rather than an asteroid which has long been the leading candidate among scientists.
  - Researchers report, for the first time, the detection of lifeforms 872 m below the ice of Antarctica, at a depth of 1,233 m and 260 km from the open water at the Filchner-Ronne Ice Shelf's calving margin.
- 16 February – Global warming is found to cause increases of pollen season lengths and concentrations.
- 17 February – Scientists report the first sequencing of DNA from animal remains more than a million years old – in this case of a mammoth.
- 18 February
  - NASA's Mars 2020 mission (containing the Perseverance rover and Ingenuity helicopter drone) lands on Mars at Jezero Crater, after seven months of travel.
  - Astronomers report that Cygnus X-1, one of the first known black holes in the Milky Way galaxy, is substantially more massive than first thought. This finding challenges the way the evolution of massive stars is understood.
  - Teams of cognitive scientists report having established real-time communication with people undergoing a lucid dream and show that they were able to comprehend questions and use working memory.
- 19 February
  - Scientists report that the short global geomagnetic reversal – a geomagnetic excursion – of Earth's magnetic field ~42,000 years ago – the Laschamp event – in combination with grand solar minima, caused major extinctions and environmental changes and may have contributed to the extinction of the Neanderthals and appearances of cave art. It altered the geographical extension of auroras and levels of harmful radiation worldwide. They term the event which they find to constitute a major enviro-archaeological boundary "Adams Transitional Geomagnetic Event".
  - Thomas Metzinger, a German philosopher of cognitive science and applied ethics, calls for a "global moratorium on synthetic phenomenology" which, "until 2050", precautionarily bans "all research that directly aims at or knowingly risks the emergence of artificial consciousness on post-biotic carrier systems" – and could be gradually refined. The paper does not describe mechanisms of global enforcement of proposed regulations which do not consider biotic or semi-biotic systems and aims to limit suffering risks.
- 22 February – Astronomers release, for the first time, a very high-resolution map of 25,000 active supermassive black holes, covering four percent of the Northern celestial hemisphere, based on ultra-low radio wavelengths, as detected by the LOFAR in Europe.
- 25 February – Researchers confirm that the Atlantic meridional overturning circulation, which includes the Gulf Stream, is at its weakest since about 1,000 years ago, experiencing unprecedented weakening – likely due to global warming – which could result in more extreme weather events – including heatwaves and intense winters – and is moving towards a "tipping point".
- 26 February – COVID-19 pandemic: The Wall Street Journal reports that a purported patient zero of COVID-19 may have been infected by parents who visited a different food market than the Huanan Seafood Wholesale Market that has been thought to be the primary source of the infection earlier.
- 28 February – Winchcombe meteorite: Fragments of a carbonaceous chondrite meteorite, the first known in Britain, fall at Winchcombe in the English Cotswolds.

=== March ===
Science Summary for this section

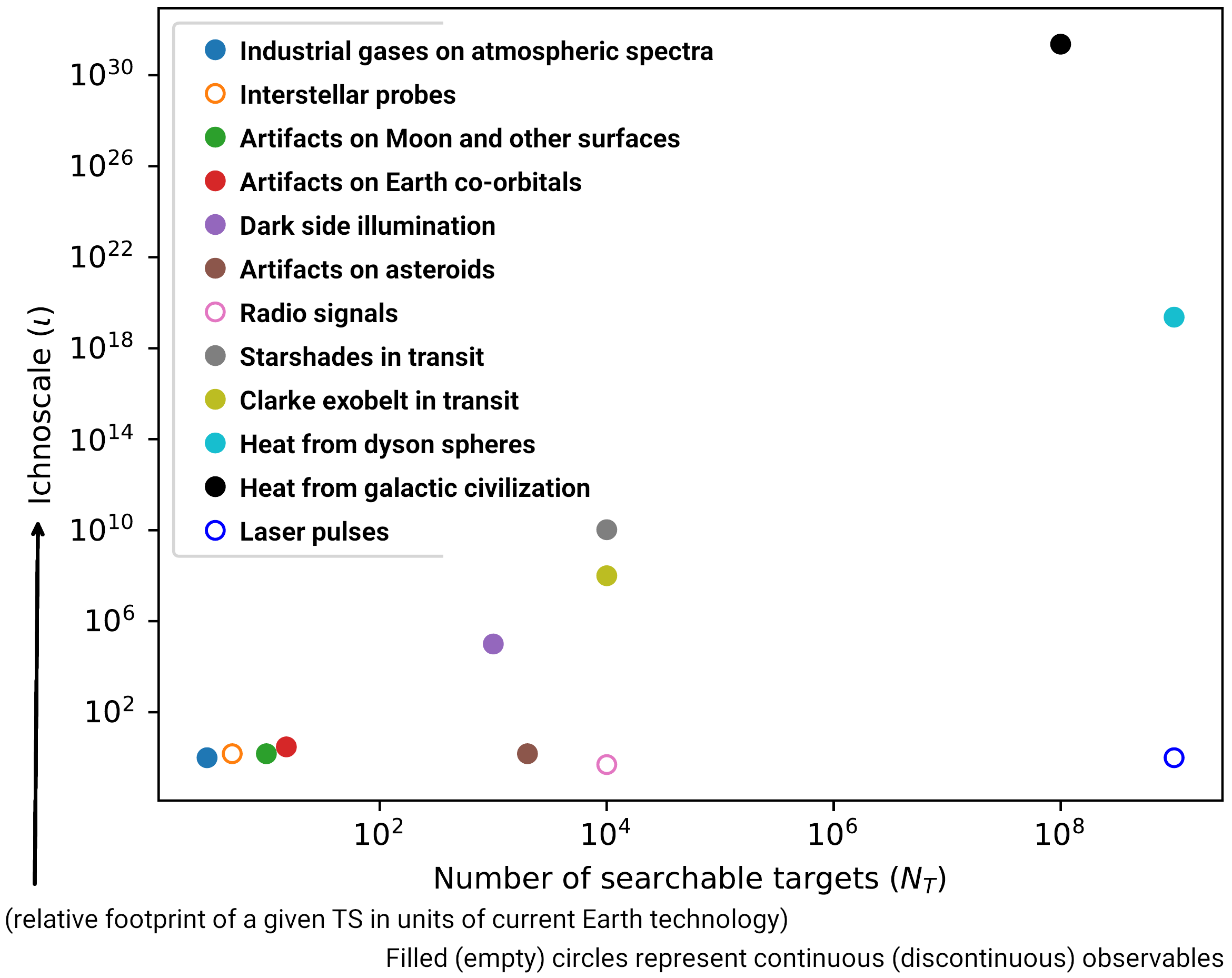
1 March: A review classifies SETI technosignatures.

- 1 March
  - A scientific review produced by the i.a. NASA-sponsored online workshop TechnoClimes 2020 about mission concepts for the search of technosignatures is published. They classify signatures based on a metric about the distance of humanity to the capacity of developing the signature's required technology, associated methods of detection and ancillary benefits of their search. The study's conclusions include robust rationales for searching artifacts within the Solar System.
- 2 March
  - Scientists report substantially more precise and regionally subdivided end times of the Acheulean, finding that it persisted long after the diffusion of Middle Palaeolithic technologies in multiple continental regions and ended over 100,000 years apart.
  - A study of data on half a million U.K. citizens shows associations between meat intake with risks of some of 25 common conditions, including ischaemic heart disease and diabetes, as well as a lower risk of iron deficiency anaemia. A study published on 31 March finds higher intake of processed meat was associated with "a higher risk of mortality and major CVD".
- 3 March
  - COVID-19 pandemic: Scientists report that a much more contagious SARS-CoV-2 variant, Lineage P.1, first detected in Japan, and more recently found in Brazil, as well as in several places in the United States, may be associated with COVID-19 disease reinfection after recovery from an earlier COVID-19 infection.
  - Scientists demonstrate a bioinspired self-powered soft robot for deep-sea operation at the deepest part of the ocean at the Mariana Trench. The robot features artificial muscles and wings out of pliable materials and electronics distributed within its silicone body and could be used for exploration and environmental monitoring.
  - Scientists report the discovery of an endosymbiont, bacteria Azoamicus ciliaticola, of an anaerobic ciliate to which it provides energy in the stored form of ATP. Unlike mitochondria, which play the same role in eukaryotes, it enables its host to breathe nitrate instead of oxygen.
- 4 March – COVID-19 pandemic: Scientists report a problematic COVID-19 variant, less susceptible to vaccines, a combination of British B.1.1.7 and South African E484K (Eeek) mutations, in the state of Oregon.
- 5 March – NASA names the landing site of the Perseverance rover in Jezero crater as "Octavia E. Butler Landing".
- 8 March
  - Astronomers report the discovery of a quasar known as P172+18, the most distant source of radio emissions known to date, some 13 billion light years away.
  - Scientists propose storing DNA and other biological reproductive structures in a "lunar ark" on the Moon of all 6.7 million species of plants, animals and fungi known on Earth – to help assure their survivability over the years.
  - Study results indicate that limiting global warming to 1.5 °C would prevent most of the tropics from reaching the wet-bulb temperature of the human physiological limit.
  - A new global food emissions database indicates that food systems are responsible for one third of the global anthropogenic GHG emissions.
  - Scientists report that some of Elysia marginata sea slugs can shed and regenerate their parasitised whole body from their head which is capable of photosynthesis.

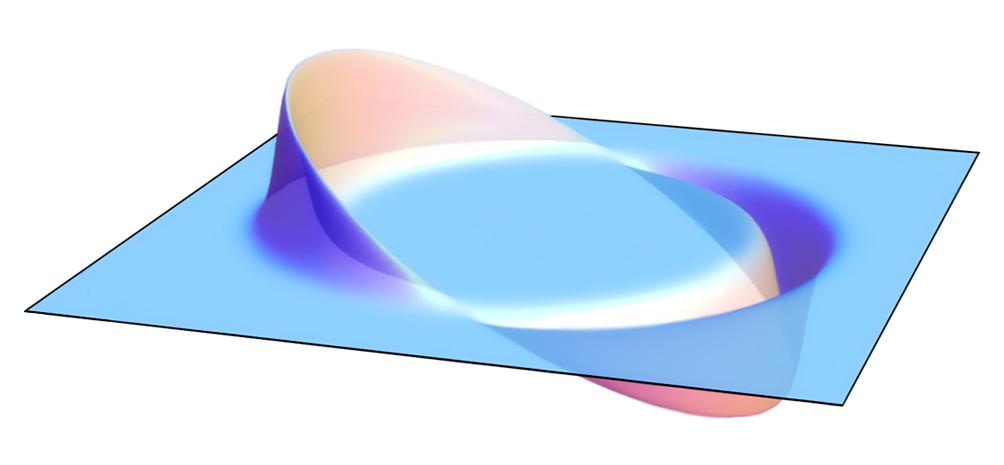
9 March: Erik Lentz describes a way warp drives sourced from known and familiar purely positive energy could exist.

- 9 March
  - Physicists report that according to their theoretical model traversable microscopic wormholes may be possible and not require any exotic matter. Another study published on the same day finds that humanly traversable wormholes may be possible if reality can broadly be described by the Randall–Sundrum model 2, which is a brane-based theory consistent with string theory.
  - A physicist describes a way warp drives sourced from known and familiar purely positive energy could exist – warp bubbles based on superluminal self-reinforcing "soliton" waves. It may allow for up to Faster-than-light speed travel, transfers and communication with the large energy requirements possibly being reducible.
  - Scientists use novel lipid nanoparticles to deliver CRISPR genome editing into the livers of mice, resulting in a 57% reduction of LDL cholesterol levels.
- 10 March
  - Researchers describe a CRISPR-dCas9 epigenome editing method for a potential treatment of chronic pain, an analgesia that represses Na_{v}1.7 and showed therapeutic potential in three mouse models of pain.
  - COVID-19 pandemic: A cohort study of patients matched by similarity finds that the probability of increased mortality from VOC-202012/01 is high, increasing from 0.25 to 0.41% in the low-risk group of the database without controlling for U.K. vaccination campaign effects. A study published on 15 March estimates the strain's mortality-risk to be ~61% (42–82%) higher than that of pre-existing variants.
  - An analysis of the leaked and allegedly manipulated data about COVID-19 vaccines indicates concerns over percentage of intact mRNA in early commercial batches of mRNA vaccines, possibly reflecting a lack of certainty that relates to their efficacy at the time.
  - A new microscopy technique using a hyperbolic metamaterial is shown to boost imaging resolutions, from 200 nanometres down to 40 nanometres.

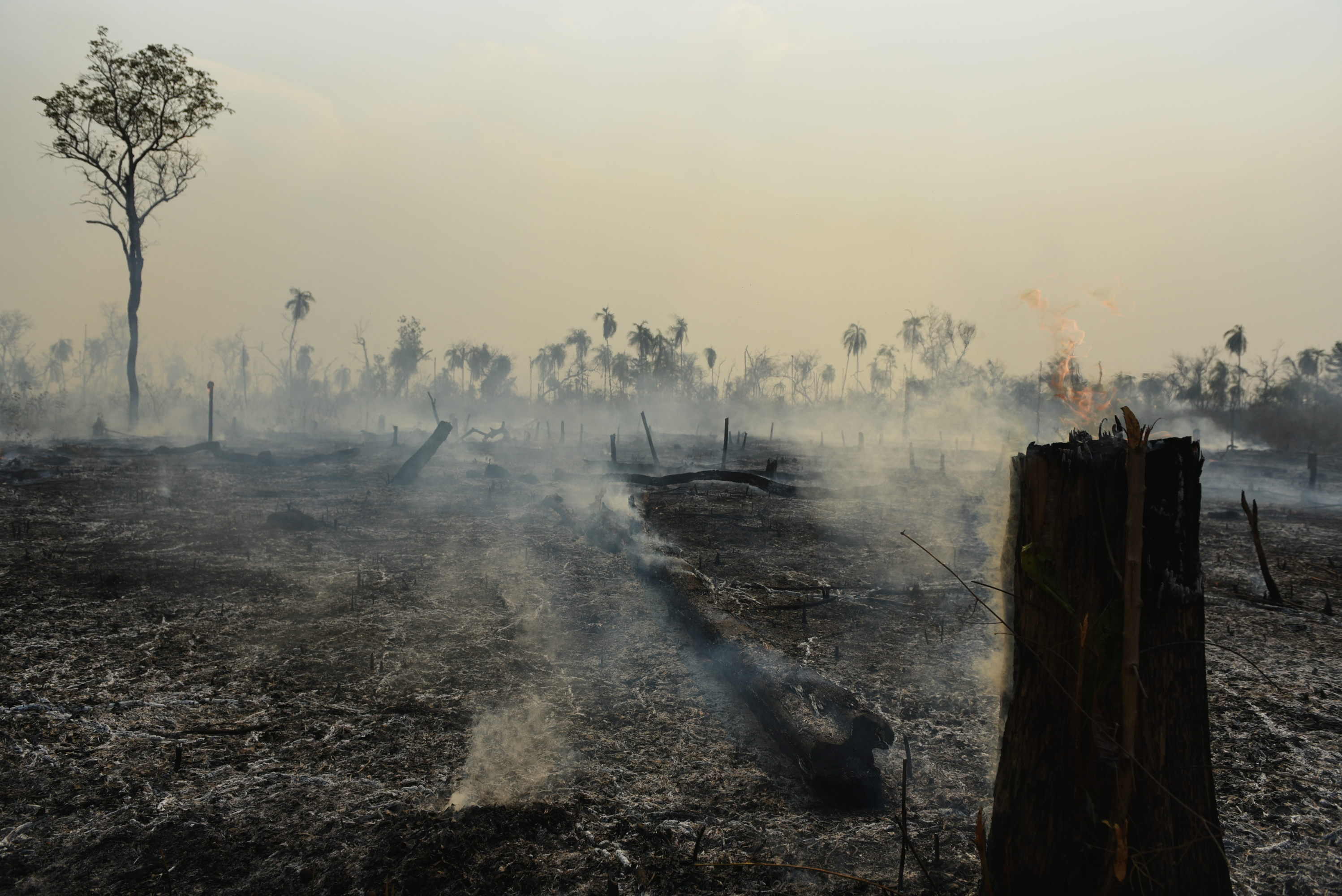
11 March: A review finds that the Amazon basin currently emits more greenhouse gases than it absorbs overall.

- 11 March – Results of a scientific synthesis indicate that, in terms of global warming, the Amazon basin with the Amazon rainforest now emits more greenhouse gases than it absorbs overall due to climate change impacts and human activities in the area – mainly deforestation.
- 15 March – Scientists report the discovery of a new unknown bacteria species, for the first time, of Methylobacterium, tentatively named Methylobacterium ajmalii, associated with three new strains, designated IF7SW-B2T, IIF1SW-B5, and IIF4SW-B5, on the International Space Station.
- 16 March – Scientists present evidence that the interstellar object ʻOumuamua may likely be a piece of a planet similar to Pluto from beyond the Solar System, ejected ~0,5 bn years ago.
- 17 March – A study finds that an optimized globally coordinated marine conservation could be "nearly twice as efficient as uncoordinated, national-level" planning and estimates that bottom trawling releases as much CO_{2}-emissions as pre-COVID-19 aviation.
- 18 March – A study finds that the severity of heatwave and drought impacts on crop production roughly tripled over the last 50 years in Europe.

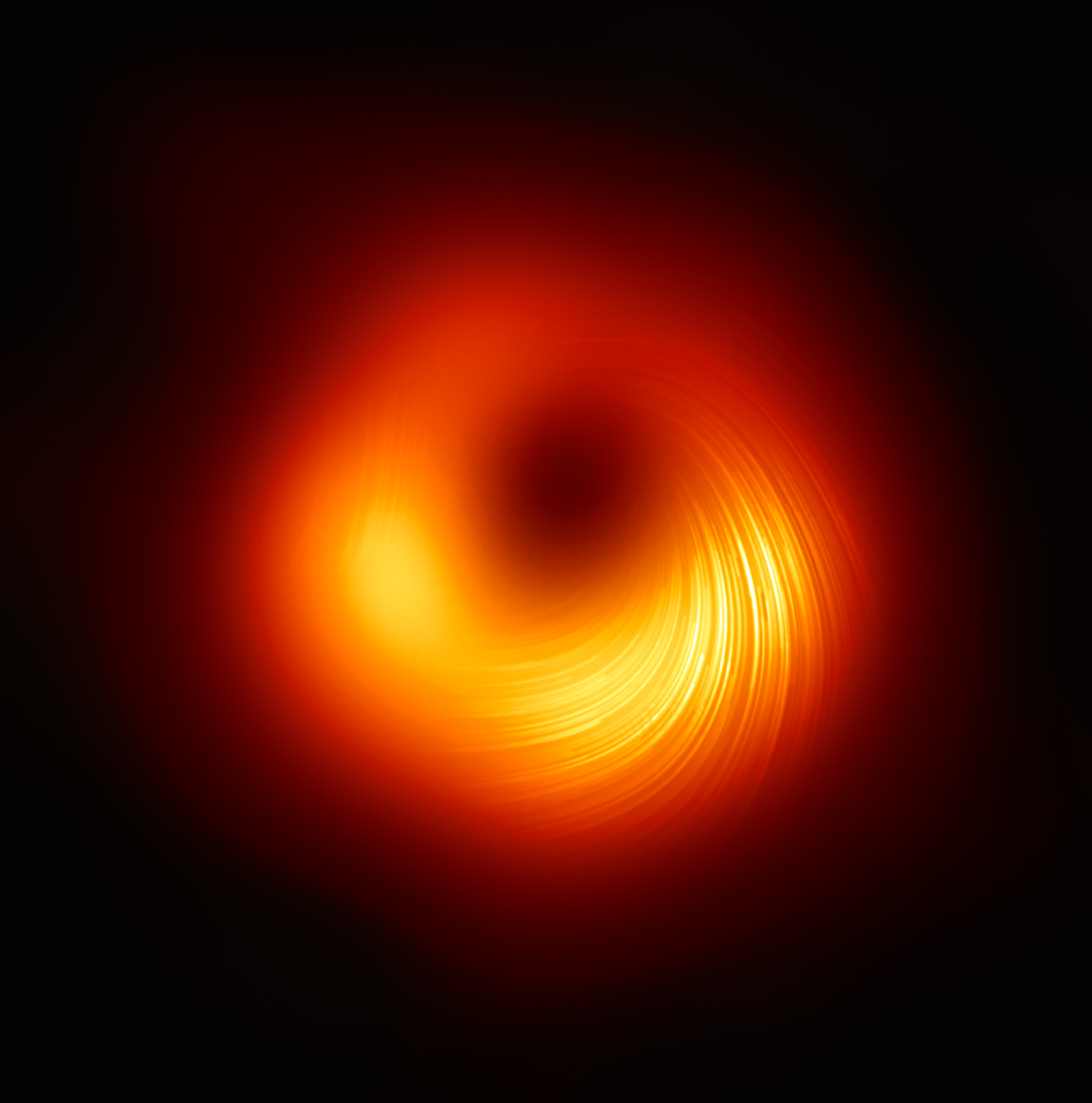
24 March: A view of the M87* supermassive black hole in polarised light

- 19 March
  - NASA reports, based on measurements of over 500 Marsquakes by the InSight lander on the planet Mars, that the core of Mars is between 1,810 and 1,860 km (1,120 and 1,160 mi), about half the size of the core of Earth, and significantly smaller – suggesting a core of lighter elements – than thought earlier.
  - Physicists confirm the first detection of an odderon, based on data collected from CERN's Large Hadron Collider.
- 22 March – Astronomers report, for the first time, that the area producing pulses of a repeating fast radio burst (FRB), particularly FRB 180916, is about 1 kilometre (0.62 miles) in scale, based on studies at extremely short timescales.
- 23 March
  - News media announces the public release, for the first time, of a comprehensive report of UFO events accumulated by the United States over the years.
  - COVID-19 pandemic: A study finds that the snapshot mass-testing for COVID-19 of ~80% of Slovakia's population during a weekend at the end of October 2020 was highly efficacious, decreasing observed prevalence by 58% within one week and 70% compared to a hypothetical scenario of no snapshot-mass-testing.
- 24 March
  - A collaboration of scientists using the Event Horizon Telescope present the first polarized-based image of a black hole, at the center of Messier 87, revealing the forces giving rise to quasars.
  - Scientists report that a delayed change in the shape of early brain cells causes the distinctly large human forebrain compared to other apes and identify a genetic regulator of it, ZEB2.
- 26 March – A collision between the asteroid 99942 Apophis and Earth is ruled out, for at least the next hundred years, based on new observations by NASA.
- 29 March
  - Tokamak Energy announces "first plasma" with its newly-upgraded prototype fusion reactor, the ST40.
  - A study estimates that the national trade-, production- and consumption-patterns of the G7 drive an average annual loss of 3.9 trees per capita.
  - A case-control study of cities finds that redistributing street space for cycling infrastructure – for so-called "pop-up bike lanes" – during the COVID-19 pandemic lead to large additional increases in cycling.
  - The extensive pesticide pollution risks worldwide are estimated with a new environmental model.
- 30 March – Scientists report evidence of subglacial sediment stored since 1966 that indicates that Greenland was ice-free and vegetated at least once within the last million years.
- 31 March
  - The first high-bandwidth, wireless brain-computer interface is demonstrated, with 200 electrodes providing 48 megabits per second (Mbit/s) of neural signals.
  - The first 3D atomic imaging of an amorphous solid is presented, showing the 18,000 atoms in a particle of metallic glass.
  - A report about the leading causes of death in the U.S. for 2020 is published.

== Deaths ==
- 4 January – Martinus J. G. Veltman, Dutch theoretical physicist and Nobel Prize laureate (b. 1931)
- 28 January – Paul J. Crutzen, Dutch meteorologist and atmospheric chemist, Nobel Prize laureate (b. 1933)
- 16 February – Bernard Lown, Lithuanian-born American inventor and cardiologist (b. 1921)

== See also ==
- Category:Science events
- Category:Science timelines
- Impact of the COVID-19 pandemic on science and technology
- List of technologies
- List of emerging technologies
- List of years in science
