= Methylorubrum salsuginis =

Scientific classification
- Domain: Bacteria
- Kingdom: Pseudomonadati
- Phylum: Pseudomonadota
- Class: Alphaproteobacteria
- Order: Hyphomicrobiales
- Family: Methylobacteriaceae
- Genus: Methylorubrum
- Species: M. salsuginis

Binomial name
- Methylorubrum salsuginis (Wang et al. 2007) Green and Ardley 2018

Type strain
- CGMCC 1.6474, NCCB 100140

Synonyms
- Methylobacterium aquamaris; Methylobacterium salsuginis Wang et al. 2007

Species of bacterium

Methylorubrum salsuginis is a facultatively methylotrophic bacteria from the genus Methylorubrum which has been isolated from seawater.
