= Methylobacterium brachythecii =

Scientific classification
- Domain: Bacteria
- Kingdom: Pseudomonadati
- Phylum: Pseudomonadota
- Class: Alphaproteobacteria
- Order: Hyphomicrobiales
- Family: Methylobacteriaceae
- Genus: Methylobacterium
- Species: M. brachythecii

Binomial name
- Methylobacterium brachythecii Tani and Sahin 2013

Type strain
- 99b, DSM 24105, NBRC 107710

Species of bacterium

Methylobacterium brachythecii is a facultatively methylotrophic bacteria from the genus of Methylobacterium which has been isolated from the moss Brachythecium plumosum in Japan.
