= Methylobacterium frigidaeris =

Scientific classification
- Domain: Bacteria
- Kingdom: Pseudomonadati
- Phylum: Pseudomonadota
- Class: Alphaproteobacteria
- Order: Hyphomicrobiales
- Family: Methylobacteriaceae
- Genus: Methylobacterium
- Species: M. frigidaeris

Binomial name
- Methylobacterium frigidaeris Lee and Jeon 2018

Type strain
- JCM 32048, KACC 19280, strain IER25-16

Species of bacterium

Methylobacterium frigidaeris is a Gram-negative, aerobic, methylotrophic and motile bacteria from the genus of Methylobacterium which has been isolated from an air conditioning system from Korea.
