= Methylobacterium phyllosphaerae =

Methylobacterium persicinum

Scientific classification
- Domain: Bacteria
- Kingdom: Pseudomonadati
- Phylum: Pseudomonadota
- Class: Alphaproteobacteria
- Order: Hyphomicrobiales
- Family: Methylobacteriaceae
- Genus: Methylobacterium
- Species: M. persicinum

Binomial name
- Methylobacterium persicinum Madhaiyan et al. 2009

Type strain
- CBMB27, DSM 19779, JCM 16408, KACC 11716, LMG 24361

Species of bacterium

Methylobacterium persicinum is a facultatively methylotrophic and aerobic bacteria from the genus of Methylobacterium which has been isolated from the rice plant Oryza sativa in Iksan in Korea.
