= Methylobacterium adhaesivum =

Scientific classification
- Domain: Bacteria
- Kingdom: Pseudomonadati
- Phylum: Pseudomonadota
- Class: Alphaproteobacteria
- Order: Hyphomicrobiales
- Family: Methylobacteriaceae
- Genus: Methylobacterium
- Species: M. adhaesivum

Binomial name
- Methylobacterium adhaesivum Gallego et al. 2006

Type strain
- AR27, CCM 7305, CECT 7069, DSM 17169, KCTC 22099, LMG 28244, NCIMB 14625, Ventosa AR27, Willems R-52860

Species of bacterium

Methylobacterium adhaesivum is a Gram-negative, methylotrophic, non-spore-forming strictly aerobic and motile bacteria from the genus of Methylobacterium which has been isolated from drinking water in Seville in Spain.
