= Methylorubrum populi =

Scientific classification
- Domain: Bacteria
- Kingdom: Pseudomonadati
- Phylum: Pseudomonadota
- Class: Alphaproteobacteria
- Order: Hyphomicrobiales
- Family: Methylobacteriaceae
- Genus: Methylorubrum
- Species: M. populi

Binomial name
- Methylorubrum populi (Van Aken et al. 2004) Green and Ardley 2018

Synonyms
- Methylobacterium populi Van Aken et al. 2004

Species of bacterium

Methylorubrum populi is an aerobic, pink-pigmented, facultatively methylotrophic, methane-utilizing bacterium isolated from poplar trees (Populus deltoides, hence its name). Its type strain is BJ001^{T} (=ATCC BAA-705^{T} =NCIMB 13946^{T}).
