= Methylobacterium marchantiae =

Scientific classification
- Domain: Bacteria
- Kingdom: Pseudomonadati
- Phylum: Pseudomonadota
- Class: Alphaproteobacteria
- Order: Hyphomicrobiales
- Family: Methylobacteriaceae
- Genus: Methylobacterium
- Species: M. marchantiae

Binomial name
- Methylobacterium marchantiae Schauer et al. 2011

Type strain
- CCUG 56108, DSM 21328, JT1

Species of bacterium

Methylobacterium marchantiae is a facultatively methylotrophic facultative methylotrophy bacteria from the genus of Methylobacterium which has been isolated from the moos Marchantia polymorpha in Bergpark Wilhelmshöhe near Kassel in Germany.
