= Methylorubrum pseudosasae =

Scientific classification
- Domain: Bacteria
- Kingdom: Pseudomonadati
- Phylum: Pseudomonadota
- Class: Alphaproteobacteria
- Order: Hyphomicrobiales
- Family: Methylobacteriaceae
- Genus: Methylorubrum
- Species: M. pseudosasae

Binomial name
- Methylorubrum pseudosasae (Madhaiyan and Poonguzhali 2016) Green and Ardley 2018

Type strain
- ICMP 17622, BL44, NBRC 105205

Synonyms
- Methylobacterium pseudosasae Madhaiyan and Poonguzhali 2016

Species of bacterium

Methylorubrum pseudosasae is a Gram-negative, aerobic, facultatively methylotrophic bacteria from the genus Methylorubrum which has been isolated from bamboo leaves.
