= Methylobacterium persicinum =

Scientific classification
- Domain: Bacteria
- Kingdom: Pseudomonadati
- Phylum: Pseudomonadota
- Class: Alphaproteobacteria
- Order: Hyphomicrobiales
- Family: Methylobacteriaceae
- Genus: Methylobacterium
- Species: M. persicinum

Binomial name
- Methylobacterium persicinum Kato et al. 2008

Type strain
- 002-165, DSM 19562, NBRC 103628, NCIMB 14378

Species of bacterium

Methylobacterium persicinum is a Gram-negative, facultatively methylotrophic, strictly aerobic and non-spore-forming bacteria from the genus of Methylobacterium which has been isolated from water from a food factory in Japan.
