= Methylorubrum suomiense =

Scientific classification
- Domain: Bacteria
- Kingdom: Pseudomonadati
- Phylum: Pseudomonadota
- Class: Alphaproteobacteria
- Order: Hyphomicrobiales
- Family: Methylobacteriaceae
- Genus: Methylorubrum
- Species: M. suomiense

Binomial name
- Methylorubrum suomiense (Doronina et al. 2002) Green and Ardley 2018

Type strain
- ATCC BAA-713, DSM 14458, F20 T, KCTC 12963 T, NCIMB 13778 T, VKM B-2238

Synonyms
- Methylobacterium suomiense Doronina et al. 2002

Species of bacterium

Methylorubrum suomiense is a facultatively methylotrophic and aerobic bacteria from the genus Methylorubrum which has been isolated from forest soil in Finland.
