= Methylobacterium gossipiicola =

Scientific classification
- Domain: Bacteria
- Kingdom: Pseudomonadati
- Phylum: Pseudomonadota
- Class: Alphaproteobacteria
- Order: Hyphomicrobiales
- Family: Methylobacteriaceae
- Genus: Methylobacterium
- Species: M. gossipiicola

Binomial name
- Methylobacterium gossipiicola Madhaiyan et al. 2012

Type strain
- CCM 7572, Gh-105, Gh5, B-51692

Species of bacterium

Methylobacterium gossipiicola is a Gram-negative, aerobic, facultatively methylotrophic bacteria from the genus of Methylobacterium which has been isolated from cotton in Coimbatore in India.
