= Methylobacterium organophilum =

Scientific classification
- Domain: Bacteria
- Kingdom: Pseudomonadati
- Phylum: Pseudomonadota
- Class: Alphaproteobacteria
- Order: Hyphomicrobiales
- Family: Methylobacteriaceae
- Genus: Methylobacterium
- Species: M. organophilum

Binomial name
- Methylobacterium organophilum Patt et al. 1976

Type strain
- ATCC 27886, BCRC 10934, CCM 4460, CCRC 10934, CIP 101049, DSM 760, FIRDI 934, HAMBI 2263, IFO 15689, JCM 2833, LMD 78.41, LMG 6083, NBRC 15689, NCCB 78041, NCIB 11278, NCIMB 11278, R.S., T. Urakami TK 0047, TK 0047, Urakami TK0047, VKM B-2066, XX, XX ATCC27886

Species of bacterium

Methylobacterium organophilum is a facultatively methylotrophic bacteria from the genus of Methylobacterium which was isolated from sediments from the Lake Mendota in Madison in the United States. Methylobacterium organophilum can degrade methanol.
