= Methylobacterium oxalidis =

Scientific classification
- Domain: Bacteria
- Kingdom: Pseudomonadati
- Phylum: Pseudomonadota
- Class: Alphaproteobacteria
- Order: Hyphomicrobiales
- Family: Methylobacteriaceae
- Genus: Methylobacterium
- Species: M. oxalidis

Binomial name
- Methylobacterium oxalidis Tani et al. 2012

Type strain
- 35a, DSM 24028, LMG 28250, NBRC 107715, NCIMB 14840, Willems R-52867

Species of bacterium

Methylobacterium oxalidis is a Gram-negative, facultatively methylotrophic, non-spore-forming and motile bacteria from the genus of Methylobacterium which has been isolated from the leaves of the plant Oxalis corniculata in Japan.
