= Methylobacterium brachiatum =

Scientific classification
- Domain: Bacteria
- Kingdom: Pseudomonadati
- Phylum: Pseudomonadota
- Class: Alphaproteobacteria
- Order: Hyphomicrobiales
- Family: Methylobacteriaceae
- Genus: Methylobacterium
- Species: M. brachiatum

Binomial name
- Methylobacterium brachiatum Kato et al. 2008

Type strain
- B0021, DSM 19569, NBRC 103629, NCIMB 14379

Species of bacterium

Methylobacterium brachiatum is a Gram-negative, strictly aerobic, facultatively methylotrophic and non-spore-forming bacteria from the genus of Methylobacterium which has been isolated from water from food processing factories in Japan.
