= Methylobacterium tarhaniae =

Scientific classification
- Domain: Bacteria
- Kingdom: Pseudomonadati
- Phylum: Pseudomonadota
- Class: Alphaproteobacteria
- Order: Hyphomicrobiales
- Family: Methylobacteriaceae
- Genus: Methylobacterium
- Species: M. tarhaniae

Binomial name
- Methylobacterium tarhaniae Veyisoglu et al. 2013

Type strain
- DSM 25844, KCTC 23615, N4211

Species of bacterium

Methylobacterium tarhaniae is a Gram-negative, aerobic and facultatively methylotrophic bacteria from the genus of Methylobacterium which has been isolated from arid soil in Abuja in Nigeria.
