= Methylorubrum thiocyanatum =

Scientific classification
- Domain: Bacteria
- Kingdom: Pseudomonadati
- Phylum: Pseudomonadota
- Class: Alphaproteobacteria
- Order: Hyphomicrobiales
- Family: Methylobacteriaceae
- Genus: Methylorubrum
- Species: M. thiocyanatum

Binomial name
- Methylorubrum thiocyanatum (Wood et al. 1999) Green and Ardley 2018

Type strain
- ALL/SCN-P, ALL/SCN-P DSM11490, ATCC 700647, DSM 11490, JCM 10893, NCIMB 13651, VKM B-2197

Synonyms
- Methylobacterium thiocyanatum Wood et al. 1999

Species of bacterium

Methylorubrum thiocyanatum is a facultative methylotroph bacteria from the genus Methylorubrum that has been isolated from soil around the plant Allium aflatunense in Warwickshire, United Kingdom.
