= Methylobacterium gregans =

Scientific classification
- Domain: Bacteria
- Kingdom: Pseudomonadati
- Phylum: Pseudomonadota
- Class: Alphaproteobacteria
- Order: Hyphomicrobiales
- Family: Methylobacteriaceae
- Genus: Methylobacterium
- Species: M. gregans

Binomial name
- Methylobacterium gregans Kato et al. 2008

Type strain
- 002-074, DSM 19564, NBRC 103626, NCIMB 14376

Synonyms
- Methylobacterium gregens

Species of bacterium

Methylobacterium gregans is a Gram-negative, strictly aerobic, facultatively methylotrophic and non-spore-forming bacteria from the genus of Methylobacterium which has been isolated from water samples from food factories in Japan.
