= Methylobacterium bullatum =

Scientific classification
- Domain: Bacteria
- Kingdom: Pseudomonadati
- Phylum: Pseudomonadota
- Class: Alphaproteobacteria
- Order: Hyphomicrobiales
- Family: Methylobacteriaceae
- Genus: Methylobacterium
- Species: M. bullatum

Binomial name
- Methylobacterium bullatum Hoppe et al. 2012

Type strain
- DSM 21893, F3.2, LMG 24788

Synonyms
- Methylobacterium funariae Methylobacterium superadornatum

Species of bacterium

Methylobacterium bullatum is a Gram-negative, facultatively methylotrophic, strictly aerobic and non-spore-forming bacteria from the genus of Methylobacterium which has been isolated from the moss Funaria hygrometrica in the Bergpark Wilhelmshöhe near Kassel in Germany.
