= Methylobacterium trifolii =

Scientific classification
- Domain: Bacteria
- Kingdom: Pseudomonadati
- Phylum: Pseudomonadota
- Class: Alphaproteobacteria
- Order: Hyphomicrobiales
- Family: Methylobacteriaceae
- Genus: Methylobacterium
- Species: M. trifolii

Binomial name
- Methylobacterium trifolii Wellner et al. 2013

Type strain
- CCM 7786, LMG 25778, TA73

Species of bacterium

Methylobacterium trifolii is a Gram-negative, aerobic, facultatively methylotrophic and rod-shaped bacteria from the genus of Methylobacterium.
