= Methylobacterium nodulans =

Scientific classification
- Domain: Bacteria
- Kingdom: Pseudomonadati
- Phylum: Pseudomonadota
- Class: Alphaproteobacteria
- Order: Hyphomicrobiales
- Family: Methylobacteriaceae
- Genus: Methylobacterium
- Species: M. nodulans

Binomial name
- Methylobacterium nodulans Jourand et al. 2004

Species of bacterium

Methylobacterium nodulans is an aerobic, facultatively methylotrophic, legume root nodule-forming and nitrogen-fixing bacteria.
