= Methylobacterium thuringiense =

Scientific classification
- Domain: Bacteria
- Kingdom: Pseudomonadati
- Phylum: Pseudomonadota
- Class: Alphaproteobacteria
- Order: Hyphomicrobiales
- Family: Methylobacteriaceae
- Genus: Methylobacterium
- Species: M. thuringiense

Binomial name
- Methylobacterium thuringiense Wellner et al. 2013

Type strain
- C34, CCM 7787, LMG 25777

Species of bacterium

Methylobacterium thuringiense is a Gram-negative, aerobic, facultatively methylotrophic and rod-shaped bacteria from the genus of Methylobacterium.
