= Psychroglaciecola arctica =

Scientific classification
- Domain: Bacteria
- Kingdom: Pseudomonadati
- Phylum: Pseudomonadota
- Class: Alphaproteobacteria
- Order: Hyphomicrobiales
- Family: Methylobacteriaceae
- Genus: Psychroglaciecola
- Species: P. arctica

Binomial name
- Psychroglaciecola arctica Qu et al. 2014

Type strain
- CCTCC AB 2013033, KACC 17684, M6-76

Species of bacterium

Psychroglaciecola arctica is a Gram-negative, facultatively methylotrophic, aerobic and motile bacterium in the genus Psychroglaciecola. Its single polar flagellum has been isolated from glacial foreland soil near Ny-Ålesund in Norway.
