= Methylobacterium phyllostachyos =

Scientific classification
- Domain: Bacteria
- Kingdom: Pseudomonadati
- Phylum: Pseudomonadota
- Class: Alphaproteobacteria
- Order: Hyphomicrobiales
- Family: Methylobacteriaceae
- Genus: Methylobacterium
- Species: M. phyllostachyos

Binomial name
- Methylobacterium phyllostachyos Madhaiyan and Poonguzhali 2014

Type strain
- ICMP 17619, BL47, NBRC 105206

Species of bacterium

Methylobacterium phyllostachyos is a Gram-negative, non-spore-forming, aerobic and facultatively methylotrophic bacteria from the genus Methylobacterium which has been isolated from the surface of a bamboo leaf.
