= Methylorubrum rhodesianum =

Scientific classification
- Domain: Bacteria
- Kingdom: Pseudomonadati
- Phylum: Pseudomonadota
- Class: Alphaproteobacteria
- Order: Hyphomicrobiales
- Family: Methylobacteriaceae
- Genus: Methylorubrum
- Species: M. rhodesianum

Binomial name
- Methylorubrum rhodesianum (Green et al. 1988) Green and Ardley 2018

Synonyms
- Methylobacterium lusitanum Doronina et al. 2002; Methylobacterium rhodesianum Green et al. 1988

Species of bacterium

Methylorubrum rhodesianum is a species of alphaproteobacteria. It has been found on the International Space Station (ISS) amongst others.

Methylorubrum rhodesianum has the potential to be a biofertilizer due to its ability to fix nitrogen. By associating with plants, it can enhance nutrients and support plant growth, helping improve agricultural practices in a sustainable way.
