= Pink-Pigmented Facultative Methylotrophs =

Pink-Pigmented Facultative Methylotrophs, commonly abbreviated to PPFMs, are bacteria that are members of the genus Methylobacterium and are commonly found in soil, dust, various fresh water supplies and on plant surfaces. Although Gram negative, Methylobacteria often stain gram variable and are easily isolated using methanol-based mineral medium. Their pigmentation, which is frequently pink but may also be yellow or orange, is thought to provide protection from solar UV radiation which damages the DNA of bacteria at low doses because of their small cell size. This color is present due to the carotenoid pigments within the cell.

== Metabolism ==
The metabolism of PPFMs is unusual because, as their name suggests, they are able to utilize C1 compounds such as formaldehyde, methanol and methylamine. PPFM bacteria can undergo methylotrophy, a process in which the bacteria oxidize methanol with the help of the enzymes methanol dehydrogenase (MDH) and pyrroloquinoline quinone (PQQ)-linked protein. In dense and diverse communities like those found in the phyllosphere and rhizosphere, this enables them to utilize nutrients other bacteria cannot, enhancing their competitive ability. In certain environments there are limited concentrations of elements such as carbon and phosphate in a usable form. Research suggests that PPFMs breakdown unusable forms of carbon into usable forms for other species forming symbiotic relationships.

== Symbiosis with plants ==
PPFM bacteria form symbiotic relationships with numerous species of plants. PPFMs are horizontally transmitted to the next generation of plants through their seeds. This relationship is beneficial for plants, as the PPFMs produce cytokinins. Plants with more growth showed an increased concentration in cytokinin production, but credit has yet to be given to the bacteria. It has also been established that PPFM symbionts produce additional growth factors such as ethylene, auxins, and gibberellic acid which benefit the plants. This relationship is a model for plant-microbe interactions. As mentioned, PPFMs are known for their ability to utilize methanol as a sole energy source. It has been reported that trees and crop species emit large amounts of the alcohol methanol from their stomata, which potentially attracts symbiotic species. Interestingly, younger trees emit even more methanol which may encourage a healthy population of PPFM from an early stage of growth. Methanol breakdown by PPFMs allows plants to grow in different niches. Without this process, plants would not have access to enough carbon to grow efficiently. Studies also indicate that PPFM can break down additional carbon sources and also utilize phosphate efficiently, potentially providing additional assistance to plants.

Overall, research in this field suggests that a plant's growth, survival, and reproductive success are significantly better when grown symbiotically with PPFMs. So far this relationship is only beneficial to haploid gametophytes, such as liverworts and mosses, but additional relationships are being investigated. There is a global application to this research, implying that PPFMs would be appropriate probiotic for some species of plants. Research by Mark Holland suggests that the normal storage of seeds for market use (after drying in a 50°C oven for 48h) rids the seeds of their native PPFM species. Incubating seeds with PPFM prior to germination encouraged germination and growth compared to controls. Research suggests that this relationship extends to marine and freshwater plant species as well. Additional research in this field will allow scientists to understand the complicated, yet important, relationship between plants and bacteria. PPFMs offer a low-cost biotech application to encourage enhanced growth, reproduction, and preferred characteristics of plant species in numerous environments.

== See also ==
- Phyllosphere
- Rhizosphere
