= Methylobacterium iners =

Scientific classification
- Domain: Bacteria
- Kingdom: Pseudomonadati
- Phylum: Pseudomonadota
- Class: Alphaproteobacteria
- Order: Hyphomicrobiales
- Family: Methylobacteriaceae
- Genus: Methylobacterium
- Species: M. iners

Binomial name
- Methylobacterium iners Weon et al. 2008

Type strain
- 5317S-33, DSM 19015, JCM 16407, KACC 11765, Kwon 5317S-33, LMG 28248, NCIMB 14630, Willems R-52864

Species of bacterium

Methylobacterium iners is a bacterium from the genus of Methylobacterium which has been isolated from an air sample in Suwon in Korea.
