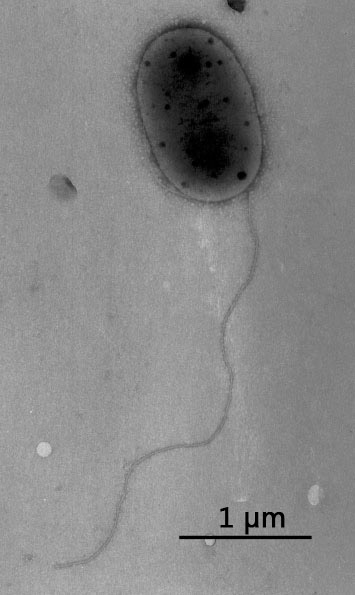

Scientific classification
- Domain: Bacteria
- Kingdom: Pseudomonadati
- Phylum: Pseudomonadota
- Class: Alphaproteobacteria
- Order: Hyphomicrobiales
- Family: Methylobacteriaceae
- Genus: Methylobacterium
- Species: M. jeotgali

Binomial name
- Methylobacterium jeotgali Aslam et al. 2007

Type strain
- KCTC 12671, Lee S2R03-9, LMG 23639, S2R03-9

= Methylobacterium jeotgali =

Species of bacterium

Methylobacterium jeotgali is a Gram-negative, strictly aerobic, motile and rod-shaped bacteria from the genus of Methylobacterium which has been isolated from fermented seafood jeotgal in Korea.
