= Methylobacterium aerolatum =

Scientific classification
- Domain: Bacteria
- Kingdom: Pseudomonadati
- Phylum: Pseudomonadota
- Class: Alphaproteobacteria
- Order: Hyphomicrobiales
- Family: Methylobacteriaceae
- Genus: Methylobacterium
- Species: M. aerolatum

Binomial name
- Methylobacterium aerolatum Weon et al. 2008

Type strain
- 5413S-11, DSM 19013, JCM 16406, KACC 11766

Synonyms
- Methylobacterium aerolata

Species of bacterium

Methylobacterium aerolatum is a and motile bacteria from the genus of Methylobacterium which has been isolated from an air sample in Suwon in Korea.
