= Methylobacterium oryzae =

Scientific classification
- Domain: Bacteria
- Kingdom: Pseudomonadati
- Phylum: Pseudomonadota
- Class: Alphaproteobacteria
- Order: Hyphomicrobiales
- Family: Methylobacteriaceae
- Genus: Methylobacterium
- Species: M. oryzae

Binomial name
- Methylobacterium oryzae Madhaiyan et al. 2007

Type strain
- CBMB20, DSM 18207, JCM 16405, KACC 11585, LMG 23582

Species of bacterium

Methylobacterium oryzae is a facultatively methylotrophic and aerobic bacteria from the genus of Methylobacterium which has been isolated from tissues of the rice plant Oryza sativa in Cheongwon in Korea. Methylobacterium oryzae can utilize 1-aminocyclopropane 1-carboxylate. Methylobacterium oryzae can promote plant growth.
