= Methylorubrum podarium =

Scientific classification
- Domain: Bacteria
- Kingdom: Pseudomonadati
- Phylum: Pseudomonadota
- Class: Alphaproteobacteria
- Order: Hyphomicrobiales
- Family: Methylobacteriaceae
- Genus: Methylorubrum
- Species: M. podarium

Binomial name
- Methylorubrum podarium (Anesti et al. 2006) Green and Ardley 2018

Type strain
- ATCC BAA-547, DSM 15083, FM4

Synonyms
- Methylobacterium podarium Anesti et al. 2006

Species of bacterium

Methylorubrum podarium is a Gram-negative bacteria from the genus Methylorubrum which has been isolated from a human foot in the United Kingdom.
