= Methylobacterium soli =

Scientific classification
- Domain: Bacteria
- Kingdom: Pseudomonadati
- Phylum: Pseudomonadota
- Class: Alphaproteobacteria
- Order: Hyphomicrobiales
- Family: Methylobacteriaceae
- Genus: Methylobacterium
- Species: M. soli

Binomial name
- Methylobacterium soli Cao et al. 2013

Type strain
- CCTCC AA 208027, KCTC 22810, YIM 48816

Species of bacterium

Methylobacterium soli is a Gram-negative, non-spore-forming and rod-shaped bacteria from the genus of Methylobacterium which has been isolated from forest soil in the Sichuan Province in China. Methylobacterium soli has the ability to utilize methanol.
