= Methylobacterium-1 RNA motif =

Methylobacterium-1 RNA
- Consensus secondary structure of Methylobacterium-1 RNAs

Identifiers
- Symbol: Methylobacterium-1 RNA
- Rfam: RF01712

Other data
- RNA type: sRNA
- Domain: Bacteria
- PDB structures: PDBe

The Methylobacterium-1 RNA motif is a conserved RNA structure discovered using bioinformatics. Almost all known examples of this RNA are found in DNA extracted from marine bacteria. However, one instance is predicted in Methylobacterium sp. 4-46, a species of alphaproteobacteria. The motif is presumed to function as a non-coding RNA.
