= Methylobacterium aquaticum =

Scientific classification
- Domain: Bacteria
- Kingdom: Pseudomonadati
- Phylum: Pseudomonadota
- Class: Alphaproteobacteria
- Order: Hyphomicrobiales
- Family: Methylobacteriaceae
- Genus: Methylobacterium
- Species: M. aquaticum

Binomial name
- Methylobacterium aquaticum Gallego et al. 2005

Type strain
- CCM 7218, CECT 5998, CIP 108333, DSM 16371, GR16, LMG 28246, NCIMB 14627, Willems R-52862

Synonyms
- Methylobacterium aquatica

Species of bacterium

Methylobacterium aquaticum is a bacterium from the genus of Methylobacterium which has been isolated from drinking water in Seville in Spain.
