= Methylobacterium isbiliense =

Scientific classification
- Domain: Bacteria
- Kingdom: Pseudomonadati
- Phylum: Pseudomonadota
- Class: Alphaproteobacteria
- Order: Hyphomicrobiales
- Family: Methylobacteriaceae
- Genus: Methylobacterium
- Species: M. isbiliense

Binomial name
- Methylobacterium isbiliense Gallego et al. 2005

Type strain
- AR24, CCM 7304, CECT 7068, DSM 17168, LMG 28245, NCIMB 14626, Willems R-52861

Species of bacterium

Methylobacterium isbiliense is a bacterium from the genus of Methylobacterium which has been isolated from drinking water in Sevilla in Spain.
