= Methylobacterium goesingense =

Scientific classification
- Domain: Bacteria
- Kingdom: Pseudomonadati
- Phylum: Pseudomonadota
- Class: Alphaproteobacteria
- Order: Hyphomicrobiales
- Family: Methylobacteriaceae
- Genus: Methylobacterium
- Species: M. goesingense

Binomial name
- Methylobacterium goesingense Idris et al. 2012

Type strain
- CCUG 56109, DSM 21331, iEII3

Species of bacterium

Methylobacterium goesingense is a bacterium from the genus of Methylobacterium which has been isolated from the endospores from the plant Thlapi goesingense in Austria. Methylobacterium goesingense is highly resistant to nickel.
