= Methylorubrum zatmanii =

Scientific classification
- Domain: Bacteria
- Kingdom: Pseudomonadati
- Phylum: Pseudomonadota
- Class: Alphaproteobacteria
- Order: Hyphomicrobiales
- Family: Methylobacteriaceae
- Genus: Methylorubrum
- Species: M. zatmanii

Binomial name
- Methylorubrum zatmanii (Green et al. 1988) Green and Ardley 2018

Synonyms
- Methylobacterium zatmanii Green et al. 1988

Species of bacterium

Methylorubrum zatmanii is a bacterium.
