= Methylobacterium longum =

Scientific classification
- Domain: Bacteria
- Kingdom: Pseudomonadati
- Phylum: Pseudomonadota
- Class: Alphaproteobacteria
- Order: Hyphomicrobiales
- Family: Methylobacteriaceae
- Genus: Methylobacterium
- Species: M. longum

Binomial name
- Methylobacterium longum Knief et al. 2012

Type strain
- 440, CECT 7806, DSM 23933

Species of bacterium

Methylobacterium longum is a facultative methylotrophy bacteria from the genus of Methylobacterium which has been isolated from the phyllosphere from the plant Arabidopsis thaliana in Spain.
