= Methylobacterium variabile =

Scientific classification
- Domain: Bacteria
- Kingdom: Pseudomonadati
- Phylum: Pseudomonadota
- Class: Alphaproteobacteria
- Order: Hyphomicrobiales
- Family: Methylobacteriaceae
- Genus: Methylobacterium
- Species: M. variabile

Binomial name
- Methylobacterium variabile Wellner et al. 2013

Type strain
- CCM 7281, CECT 7045, DSM 16961, GR3, LMG 28247, NCIMB 14628, Willems R-52863

Synonyms
- Methylobacterium variabilis

Species of bacterium

Methylobacterium variabile is a bacterium from the genus of Methylobacterium which has been isolated from drinking water in Spain.
