= Methylobacterium haplocladii =

Scientific classification
- Domain: Bacteria
- Kingdom: Pseudomonadati
- Phylum: Pseudomonadota
- Class: Alphaproteobacteria
- Order: Hyphomicrobiales
- Family: Methylobacteriaceae
- Genus: Methylobacterium
- Species: M. haplocladii

Binomial name
- Methylobacterium haplocladii Tani and Sahin 2013

Type strain
- 87e, DSM 24195, NBRC 107714

Species of bacterium

Methylobacterium haplocladii is a Gram-negative and non-spore-forming bacteria from the genus of Methylobacterium which has been isolated from the moss Haplocladium microphyllum in Japan.
