= M. oryzae =

M. oryzae may refer to:

- Merizocera oryzae, is a species of spider endemic to Sri Lanka
- Methylobacterium oryzae, a facultatively methylotrophic and aerobic bacterium isolated from tissues of rice
- Mucilaginibacter oryzae, a Gram-negative and non-spore-forming bacterium isolated from rhizosphere
