= Dihydroxyacetone synthase =

Dihydroxyacetone synthase may refer to:

- Formaldehyde transketolase, an enzyme
- Transaldolase, an enzyme
