= Methylobacterium tardum =

Scientific classification
- Domain: Bacteria
- Kingdom: Pseudomonadati
- Phylum: Pseudomonadota
- Class: Alphaproteobacteria
- Order: Hyphomicrobiales
- Family: Methylobacteriaceae
- Genus: Methylobacterium
- Species: M. tardum

Binomial name
- Methylobacterium tardum Kato et al. 2008

Type strain
- DSM 19566, NBRC 103632, NCIMB 14380, RB677

Species of bacterium

Methylobacterium tardum is a bacterium from the genus of Methylobacterium which has been isolated from water from a food factory in Japan.
