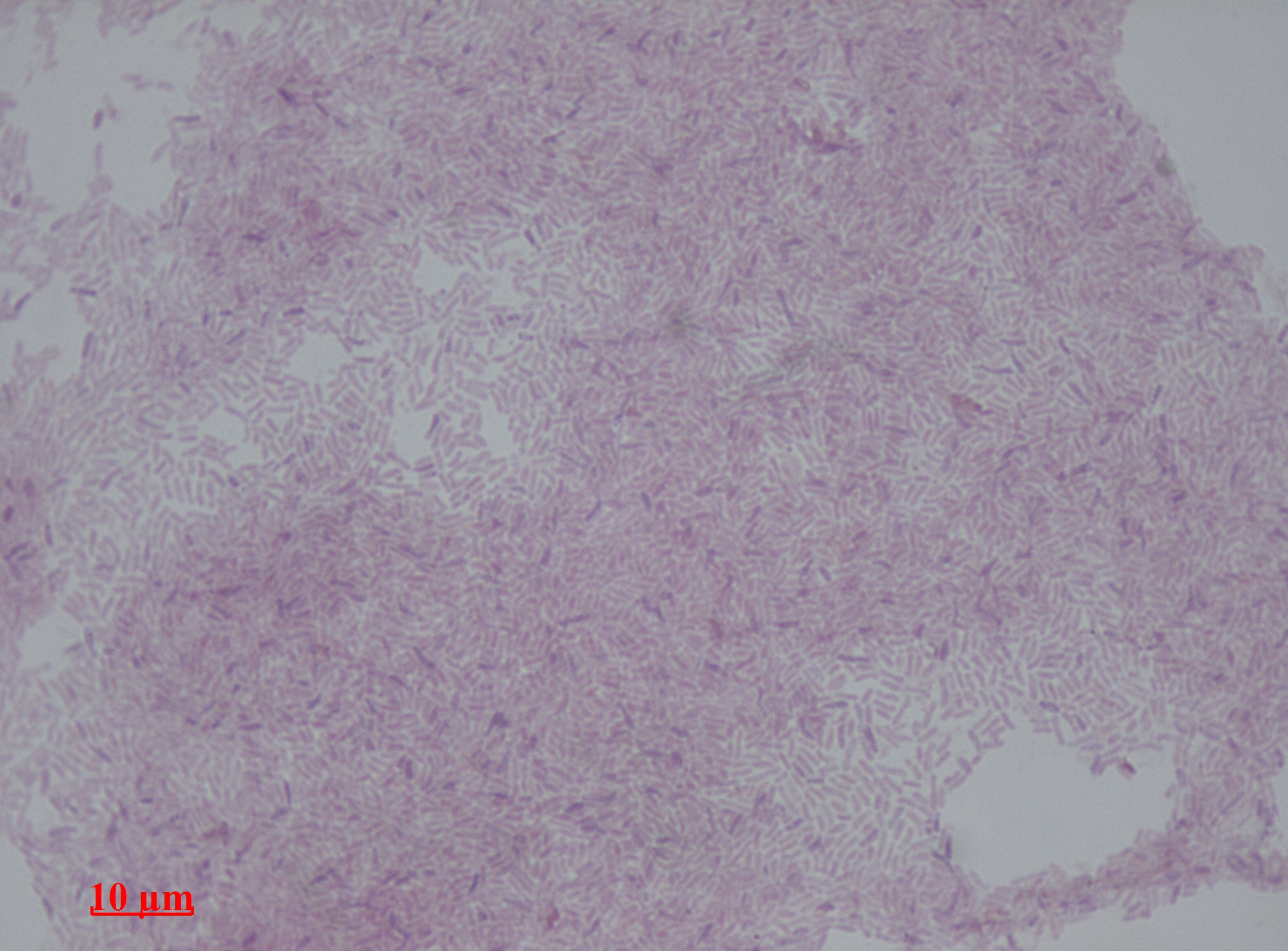
- Gram stain of Methylobacterium fujisawaense appear as negative rods under bright-field microscopy ×1000.

Scientific classification
- Domain: Bacteria
- Kingdom: Pseudomonadati
- Phylum: Pseudomonadota
- Class: Alphaproteobacteria
- Order: Hyphomicrobiales
- Family: Methylobacteriaceae
- Genus: Methylobacterium
- Species: M. fujisawaense

Binomial name
- Methylobacterium fujisawaense Green et al., 1988

= Methylobacterium fujisawaense =

Species of bacterium

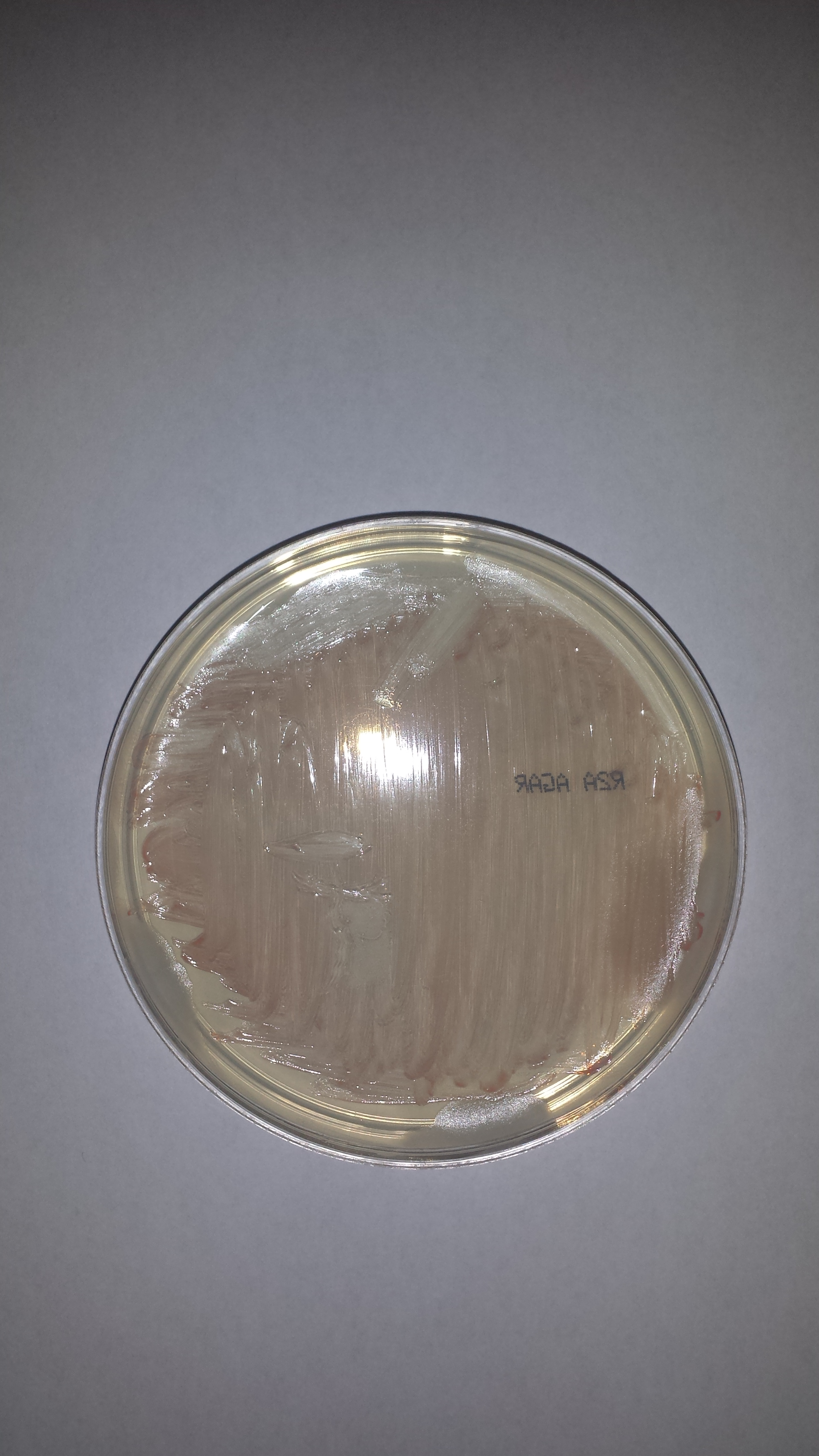
Methylobacterium fujisawaense pink-pigmented bacterial colonies growing on R2A after 5 days of incubation at 30 °C (front view).

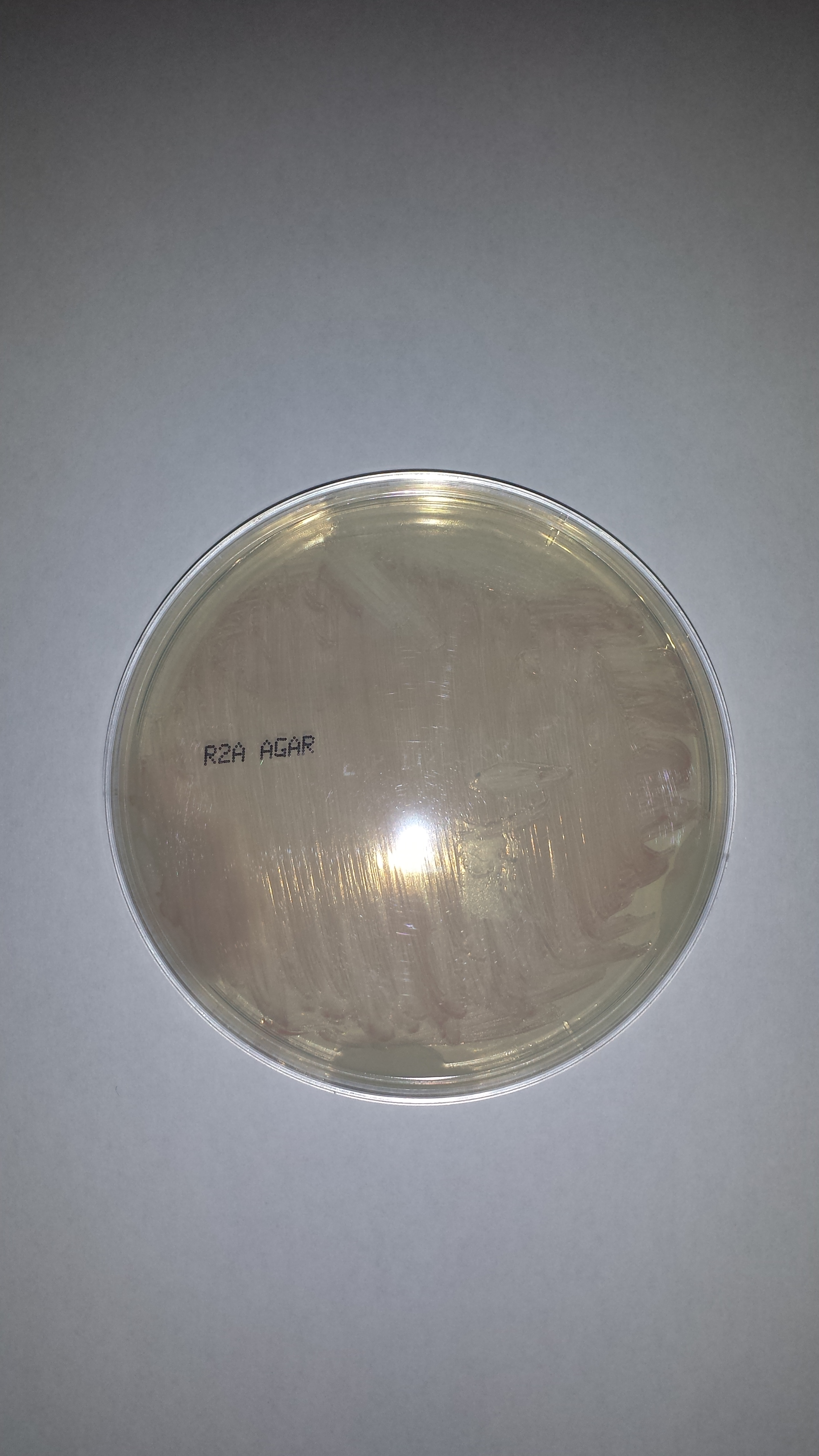
Methylobacterium fujisawaense pink-pigmented bacterial colonies growing on R2A after 5 days of incubation at 30 °C (reverse view).

Methylobacterium fujisawaense is a facultatively anaerobic, Gram-negative, rod-shaped bacteria. It is catalase-positive and oxidase-negative. It produces pink-pigment on microbiological agar media (TSA and R2A, etc.). This bacteria is facultatively methylotrophic and is widely distributed in nature. They can be isolated from soil and on occasion freshwater environments, including drinking water.

Commonly, M. fujisawaense bacteria is not established as pathogenic; however, rarely it may cause human infection/disease, mostly in immunocompromised patients.
