= Methylobacterium hispanicum =

Scientific classification
- Domain: Bacteria
- Kingdom: Pseudomonadati
- Phylum: Pseudomonadota
- Class: Alphaproteobacteria
- Order: Hyphomicrobiales
- Family: Methylobacteriaceae
- Genus: Methylobacterium
- Species: M. hispanicum

Binomial name
- Methylobacterium hispanicum Gallego et al. 2005

Type strain
- CCM 7219, CECT 5997, CIP 108332, DSM 16372, GP34

Synonyms
- Methylobacterium hispanicus

Species of bacterium

Methylobacterium hispanicum is a bacterium from the genus of Methylobacterium which has been isolated from drinking water in Seville in Spain.
