= Methylobacterium dankookense =

Scientific classification
- Domain: Bacteria
- Kingdom: Pseudomonadati
- Phylum: Pseudomonadota
- Class: Alphaproteobacteria
- Order: Hyphomicrobiales
- Family: Methylobacteriaceae
- Genus: Methylobacterium
- Species: M. dankookense

Binomial name
- Methylobacterium dankookense Lee et al. 2013

Type strain
- DSM 22415, KCTC 22512, SW08-7

Synonyms
- Methylobacterium dankookensis

Species of bacterium

Methylobacterium dankookense is a Gram-negative, rod-shaped, strictly aerobic and non-spore-forming bacteria from the genus of Methylobacterium which has been isolated from drinking water in Cheonan in Korea.
