= Methylobacterium cerastii =

Scientific classification
- Domain: Bacteria
- Kingdom: Pseudomonadati
- Phylum: Pseudomonadota
- Class: Alphaproteobacteria
- Order: Hyphomicrobiales
- Family: Methylobacteriaceae
- Genus: Methylobacterium
- Species: M. cerastii

Binomial name
- Methylobacterium cerastii Wellner et al. 2012

Type strain
- C15, CCM 7788, CCUG 60040, DSM 23679, LMG 28249, NCIMB 14837, Willems R-52867

Species of bacterium

Methylobacterium cerastii is a Gram-negative and non-spore-forming bacteria from the genus of Methylobacterium which has been isolated from the surface of a leaf from the plant Cerastium holosteoides in Thüringen in Germany.
