= Longum =

Longum may refer to:

== People ==
- Leif Longum (1927–1997), a Norwegian essayist and literary researcher

== Places ==
- Longum, Agder, a village in Arendal municipality in Agder county, Norway

== Science ==
- Longum means "long" in Latin, so it has been used in the scientific names of several living things:
  - Bifidobacterium longum, a type of bacteria of the human digestive system
  - Glottiphyllum longum, a species of succulent plant
  - Piper longum, a flowering vine also known as Indian long pepper
  - Methylobacterium longum, a facultative methylotrophy bacteria
  - Xanthophyllum longum, a tree in the family Polygalaceae

== Other ==
- Longum is type of syllable weight in poetry
