= Methylorubrum aminovorans =

Scientific classification
- Domain: Bacteria
- Kingdom: Pseudomonadati
- Phylum: Pseudomonadota
- Class: Alphaproteobacteria
- Order: Hyphomicrobiales
- Family: Methylobacteriaceae
- Genus: Methylorubrum
- Species: M. aminovorans

Binomial name
- Methylorubrum aminovorans (Urakami et al. 1993) Green and Ardley 2018

Type strain
- ATCC 51358, CCM 4612, CIP 105328, DSM 8832, IFO 15686, JCM 8240, LMG 21752, NBRC 15686, NCIMB 13343, TH-15, VKM B-2145

Synonyms
- Methylobacterium aminovorans Urakami et al. 1993

Species of bacterium

Methylorubrum aminovorans is a bacterium from the genus Methylorubrum which has been isolated from soil.
