= Methylobacterium mesophilicum =

Scientific classification
- Domain: Bacteria
- Kingdom: Pseudomonadati
- Phylum: Pseudomonadota
- Class: Alphaproteobacteria
- Order: Hyphomicrobiales
- Family: Methylobacteriaceae
- Genus: Methylobacterium
- Species: M. mesophilicum

Binomial name
- Methylobacterium mesophilicum (Austin and Goodfellow 1979); Green and Bousfield 1983

Type strain
- A47; ATCC 29983; CCUG 16482; CIP 101129; DSM 1708; ICPB 4095; IFO 15688; JCM 2829; LMG 5275; NBRC 15688; NCIB 11561; NCIMB 11561; NRRL B-14246

Synonyms
- Pseudomonas mesophilica Austin and Goodfellow 1979

Species of bacterium

Methylobacterium mesophilicum is a Gram-negative, soil-dwelling bacterium, reported to be an opportunistic pathogen in immunocomprimised patients.

Methylobacteria are typically slow-growing and produce pink-pigmented colonies. Pink pigmentation is the primary diagnostic characteristic used in the initial isolation of Methylobacteria. With extended incubation, pink colonies often take on a coral hue. M. mesophilicum and M. zatmanii are the two most commonly reported species isolated in clinical samples.

Methylobacteria have been reported to exhibit resistance to chlorination and have been isolated from tap water in various clinical settings including: an investigation of a pseudo-outbreak, water from dental units, and blood purification units. Tap water is a suspected mode of transmission. The presence of these organisms in tap water prompted suggestions that it may be helpful to monitor these organisms in water distribution systems in hospital units for immunocompromised patients.
