= Methylobacterium platani =

Scientific classification
- Domain: Bacteria
- Kingdom: Pseudomonadati
- Phylum: Pseudomonadota
- Class: Alphaproteobacteria
- Order: Hyphomicrobiales
- Family: Methylobacteriaceae
- Genus: Methylobacterium
- Species: M. platani

Binomial name
- Methylobacterium platani Kang et al. 2007

Type strain
- JCM 14648, KCTC 12901, LMG 28243, NCIMB 14624, PMB02, Willems R-52859

Species of bacterium

Methylobacterium platani is a Gram-negative, aerobic and motile bacteria from the genus of Methylobacterium which has been isolated from the tree Platanus orientalis.
