= Methylobacterium gnaphalii =

Scientific classification
- Domain: Bacteria
- Kingdom: Pseudomonadati
- Phylum: Pseudomonadota
- Class: Alphaproteobacteria
- Order: Hyphomicrobiales
- Family: Methylobacteriaceae
- Genus: Methylobacterium
- Species: M. gnaphalii

Binomial name
- Methylobacterium gnaphalii Tani et al. 2012

Type strain
- 23e, DSM 24027, NBRC 107716

Species of bacterium

Methylobacterium gnaphalii is a Gram-negative, motile and non-spore-forming bacteria from the genus of Methylobacterium which has been isolated from leaves from the plant Gnaphalium spicatum in Okayama in Japan.
