= Methylorubrum =

Scientific classification
- Domain: Bacteria
- Kingdom: Pseudomonadati
- Phylum: Pseudomonadota
- Class: Alphaproteobacteria
- Order: Hyphomicrobiales
- Family: Methylobacteriaceae
- Genus: Methylorubrum; Green and Ardley 2018

Type species
- Methylorubrum extorquens (Urakami and Komagata 1984) Green and Ardley 2018

Species
- Methylorubrum aminovorans (Urakami et al. 1993) Green and Ardley 2018; Methylorubrum extorquens (Urakami and Komagata 1984) Green and Ardley 2018; Methylorubrum podarium (Anesti et al. 2006) Green and Ardley 2018; Methylorubrum populi (Van Aken et al. 2004) Green and Ardley 2018; Methylorubrum pseudosasae (Madhaiyan and Poonguzhali 2016) Green and Ardley 2018; Methylorubrum rhodesianum (Green et al. 1988) Green and Ardley 2018; Methylorubrum rhodinum (Heumann 1962) Green and Ardley 2018; Methylorubrum salsuginis (Wang et al. 2007) Green and Ardley 2018; Methylorubrum suomiense (Doronina et al. 2002) Green and Ardley 2018; Methylorubrum thiocyanatum (Wood et al. 1999) Green and Ardley 2018; Methylorubrum zatmanii (Green et al. 1988) Green and Ardley 2018

Synonyms
- Protomonas Urakami and Komagata 1984

Genus of bacteria

Methylorubrum is a genus of bacteria from the family Methylobacteriaceae. The taxonomic validity of Methylorubrum is debated.

In 2018, 11 Methylobacterium species, including Methylobacterium extorquens, were transferred to Methylorubrum. This emendation mostly relied on the 16S rRNA gene phylogeny. In 2021 and 2022, two studies based on phylogenomic and phenotypic data independently pointed the lack of support for Methylorubrum as a distinct genus, calling for its abandonment and the reinstatement of the former Methylobacterium taxonomy. In 2025, despite controversy, and its emendation back to the original Methylobacterium taxonomy, Methylorubrum was still a valid genus name in some databases like NCBI and in the List of Prokaryotic names with Standing in Nomenclature.
