= Methylobacterium ajmalii =

Scientific classification
- Domain: Bacteria
- Kingdom: Pseudomonadati
- Phylum: Pseudomonadota
- Class: Alphaproteobacteria
- Order: Hyphomicrobiales
- Family: Methylobacteriaceae
- Genus: Methylobacterium
- Species: M. ajmalii

Binomial name
- Methylobacterium ajmalii Bijlani et al. 2021

Species of bacteria

Methylobacterium ajmalii is a species of Methylobacterium.

In March 2021, a new species, named Methylobacterium ajmalii, associated with three new strains, designated IF7SW-B2^{T}, IIF1SW-B5, and IIF4SW-B5, was reported to have been discovered, for the first time, on the International Space Station.
