= Psychroglaciecola =

Scientific classification
- Domain: Bacteria
- Kingdom: Pseudomonadati
- Phylum: Pseudomonadota
- Class: Alphaproteobacteria
- Order: Hyphomicrobiales
- Family: Methylobacteriaceae
- Genus: Psychroglaciecola; Qu et al. 2014

Type species
- Psychroglaciecola arctica

Species
- P. arctica

Genus of bacteria

Psychroglaciecola is a genus of bacteria from the family Methylobacteriaceae with one known species (Psychroglaciecola arctica).
