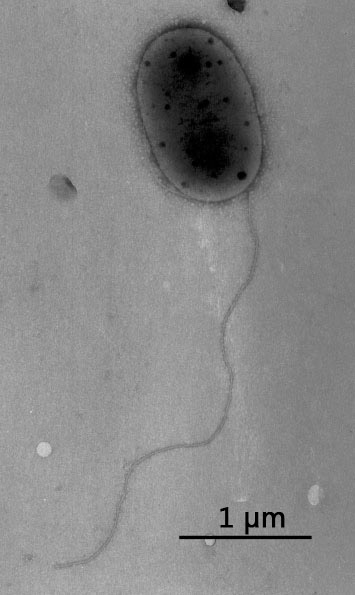
- Methylobacterium jeotgali strain S2R03-9T

Scientific classification
- Domain: Bacteria
- Kingdom: Pseudomonadati
- Phylum: Pseudomonadota
- Class: Alphaproteobacteria
- Order: Hyphomicrobiales
- Family: Methylobacteriaceae
- Genus: Methylobacterium; Patt et al. 1976 (Approved Lists 1980)

Type species
- Methylobacterium organophilum

Species
- See text.

= Methylobacterium =

Genus of bacteria

Methylobacterium is a genus of bacteria, also designated as Pink-Pigmented Facultative Methylotrophs (PPFMs). Methylobacterium is commonly found in soil, water, and particularly in association with the phyllosphere, the aerial part of plants. Methylobacterium is characterized by its ability to metabolize one-carbon compounds like methanol released by plant leaves. Methylobacterium plays key roles in nutrient cycling and plant-microbe interactions, often promoting plant growth and resilience through hormone production and stress mitigation. Methylobacterium is a model in biotechnology, already used commercially for protein production, bioremediation, and as a biostimulant in agriculture. A particular recent interest in the genus has been its role as the best-studied model system for understanding the acquisition, use, and bioaccumulation of lanthanides, also known as rare earth elements.

Methylobacterium has also been identified as a contaminant of DNA extraction kit reagents, which may lead to its erroneous appearance in microbiota or metagenomic datasets. In March 2021, a new species, named Methylobacterium ajmalii, associated with three new strains, designated IF7SW-B2^{T}, IIF1SW-B5, and IIF4SW-B5, were reported to have been discovered, for the first time, on the International Space Station.

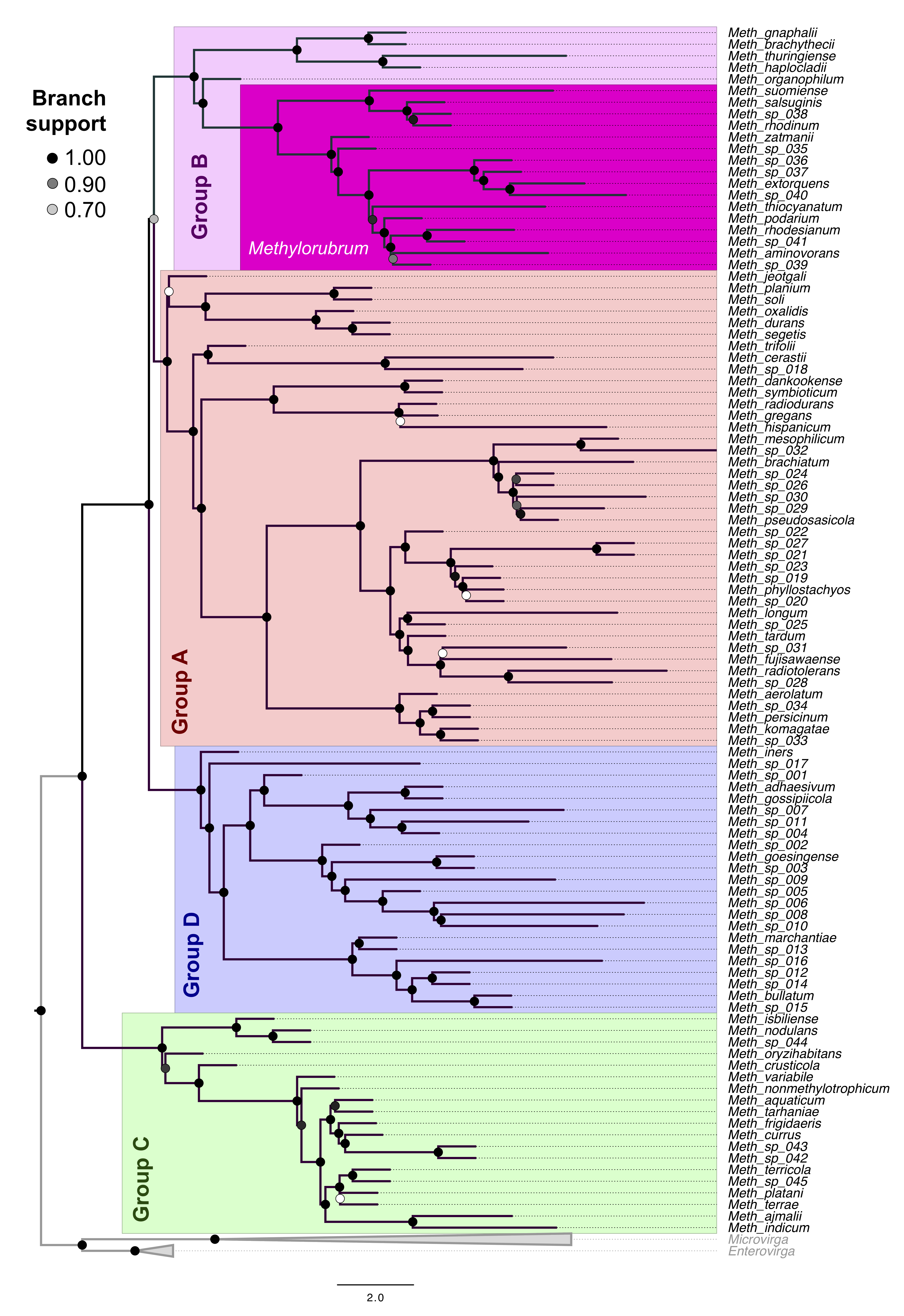
Consensus phylogeny of Methylobacterium species built from 213 Methylobacteriaceae genomes (adapted from Leducq et al. 2022)

== Debate on Methylobacterium taxonomy ==
In 2018, 11 Methylobacterium species, including Methylobacterium extorquens, were transferred to Methylorubrum. This emendation mostly relied on the 16S rRNA gene phylogeny. In 2021 and 2022, two studies based on phylogenomic and phenotypic data independently pointed the lack of support for Methylorubrum as a distinct genus, calling for its abandonment and the reinstatement of the former Methylobacterium taxonomy. In 2025, despite controversy, and its emendation back to the original Methylobacterium taxonomy, Methylorubrum was still a valid genus name in some databases like NCBI and in the List of Prokaryotic names with Standing in Nomenclature.

== Natural genetic transformation ==
Natural genetic transformation in bacteria is a process involving transfer of DNA from one cell to another through the intervening medium, and the integration of the donor sequence into the recipient genome by homologous recombination. Methylobacterium organophilum cells are able to undergo genetic transformation and become competent for DNA uptake near the end of the exponential growth phase.

== Species ==
Methylobacterium comprises the following species (excluding species reclassified in Methylorubrum):

- Methylobacterium adhaesivum Gallego et al. 2006
- Methylobacterium aerolatum Weon et al. 2008
- Methylobacterium ajmalii Bijlani et al. 2021,
- Methylobacterium aquaticum Gallego et al. 2005
- Methylobacterium brachiatum Kato et al. 2008
- Methylobacterium brachythecii Tani and Sahin 2013
- Methylobacterium bullatum Hoppe et al. 2012
- Methylobacterium cerastii Wellner et al. 2012
- Methylobacterium crusticola Jia et al. 2020
- Methylobacterium currus Park et al. 2018
- Methylobacterium dankookense Lee et al. 2013
- Methylobacterium durans Kim et al. 2020
- Methylobacterium frigidaeris Lee and Jeon 2018
- Methylobacterium fujisawaense Green et al. 1988
- "Methylobacterium funariae" Schauer and Kutschera 2011
- Methylobacterium gnaphalii Tani et al. 2012
- Methylobacterium goesingense Idris et al. 2012
- Methylobacterium gossipiicola Madhaiyan et al. 2012
- Methylobacterium gregans Kato et al. 2008
- Methylobacterium haplocladii Tani and Sahin 2013
- Methylobacterium hispanicum Gallego et al. 2005
- "Methylobacterium indicum" Chaudhry et al. 2016
- Methylobacterium iners Weon et al. 2008
- Methylobacterium isbiliense Gallego et al. 2005
- Methylobacterium jeotgali Aslam et al. 2007
- Methylobacterium komagatae Kato et al. 2008
- Methylobacterium longum Knief et al. 2012
- Methylobacterium marchantiae Schauer et al. 2011
- Methylobacterium mesophilicum (Austin and Goodfellow 1979) Green and Bousfield 1983
- Methylobacterium nodulans Jourand et al. 2004
- Methylobacterium nonmethylotrophicum Feng et al. 2020
- Methylobacterium organophilum Patt et al. 1976 (Approved Lists 1980)
- Methylobacterium oryzae Madhaiyan et al. 2007
- Methylobacterium oryzihabitans Chen et al. 2019
- Methylobacterium oxalidis Tani et al. 2012
- Methylobacterium persicinum Kato et al. 2008
- Methylobacterium phyllosphaerae Madhaiyan et al. 2009
- Methylobacterium phyllostachyos Madhaiyan and Poonguzhali 2014
- "Methylobacterium planium" Jiang et al. 2020
- Methylobacterium platani Kang et al. 2007
- Methylobacterium pseudosasicola Madhaiyan and Poonguzhali 2014
- Methylobacterium radiotolerans corrig. (Ito and Iizuka 1971) Green and Bousfield 1983
- Methylobacterium segetis Ten et al. 2020
- Methylobacterium soli Cao et al. 2013
- Methylobacterium symbioticum Pascual et al. 2021
- Methylobacterium tardum Kato et al. 2008
- Methylobacterium tarhaniae Veyisoglu et al. 2013
- "Methylobacterium terrae" Kim et al. 2019
- Methylobacterium terricola Kim et al. 2020
- Methylobacterium thuringiense Wellner et al. 2013
- Methylobacterium trifolii Wellner et al. 2013
- Methylobacterium variabile Gallego et al. 2005
