= Formaldehyde transketolase =

Class of enzymes

Identifiers
- EC no.: 2.2.1.3
- CAS no.: 76774-46-4

Databases
- BRENDA: enzyme data
- ExPASy: NiceZyme view
- KEGG: enzyme entry
- MetaCyc: metabolic pathway
- Rhea: reactions
- PDB structures: RCSB PDB PDBe PDBsum
- Gene Ontology: AmiGO / QuickGO
Search
- PMC: articles
- PubMed: articles
- NCBI: proteins

Formaldehyde transketolase (EC 2.2.1.3) is an enzyme that catalyzes the chemical reaction

D-xylulose-5-phosphoric acid
+ H_{2}C=O
glyceraldehyde 3-phosphate
+
dihydroxyacetone

The two substrates of this enzyme are D-xylulose 5-phosphoric acid and formaldehyde. Its products are glyceraldehyde 3-phosphate and dihydroxyacetone. The enzyme was characterised from the yeast Candida boidinii

This enzyme belongs to the family of transferases, specifically those transferring aldehyde or ketonic groups (transaldolases and transketolases, respectively). The systematic name of this enzyme class is D-xylulose-5-phosphate:formaldehyde glycolaldehydetransferase. This enzyme is also called dihydroxyacetone synthase. It uses thiamin diphosphate as a cofactor.
