= Methylotroph =

Microorganisms that use one-carbon compounds as main carbon source

Methylotrophs are a diverse group of microorganisms that can use reduced one-carbon compounds, such as methanol or methane, as the carbon source for their growth; and multi-carbon compounds that contain no carbon-carbon bonds, such as dimethyl ether and dimethylamine. This group of microorganisms also includes those capable of assimilating reduced one-carbon compounds by way of carbon dioxide using the ribulose bisphosphate pathway. These organisms should not be confused with methanogens which on the contrary produce methane as a by-product from various one-carbon compounds such as carbon dioxide. Some methylotrophs can degrade the greenhouse gas methane, and in this case they are called methanotrophs. The abundance, purity, and low resource cost of methanol compared to commonly used sugars make methylotrophs competent organisms for production of amino acids, vitamins, recombinant proteins, single-cell proteins, co-enzymes and cytochromes.

== Metabolism ==
General steps of methylotrophic metabolism displaying 4 known assimilatory methylotrophic pathways. The general catabolic pathway is also shown. Q denotes a membrane-bound quinone. Methane monooxygenase (MMO) and Formate dehydrogenase (FDH) may be membrane-associated or cytoplasmic while Methanol dehydrogenase (MDH) and Formaldehyde dehydrogenase (FALDH) are always membrane-associated.

The key intermediate in methylotrophic metabolism is formaldehyde, which can be diverted to either assimilatory or dissimilatory pathways. Methylotrophs produce formaldehyde through oxidation of methanol and/or methane. Methane oxidation requires the enzyme methane monooxygenase (MMO). Methylotrophs with this enzyme are given the name methanotrophs. The oxidation of methane (or methanol) can be assimilatory or dissimilatory in nature (see figure). If dissimilatory, the formaldehyde intermediate is oxidized completely into $\ce{CO2}$ to produce reductant and energy. If assimilatory, the formaldehyde intermediate is used to synthesize a 3-Carbon ($\ce{C3}$) compound for the production of biomass. Many methylotrophs use multi-carbon compounds for anabolism, thus limiting their use of formaldehyde to dissimilatory processes, however methanotrophs are generally limited to only $\ce{C1}$metabolism.

Compounds known to support methylotrophic metabolism
Single Carbon Compounds	Chemical Formula	Multi-Carbon Compounds	Chemical Formula
Carbon monoxide	$\ce{CO}$	Dimethyl ether	$\ce{(CH3)2O}$
Formaldehyde	$\ce{CH2O}$	Dimethylamine	$\ce{(CH3)2NH}$
Formamide	$\ce{HCONH2}$	Dimethyl sulfide	$\ce{(CH3)2S}$
Formic acid	$\ce{HCOOH}$	Tetramethylammonium	$\ce{(CH3)4N+}$
Methane	$\ce{CH4}$	Trimethylamine	$\ce{(CH3)3N}$
Methanol	$\ce{CH3OH}$	Trimethylamine N-oxide	$\ce{(CH3)3NO}$
Methylamine	$\ce{CH3NH2}$	Trimethylsulfonium	$\ce{(CH3)3S+}$
Methyl halide	$\ce{CH3X}$		

=== Catabolism ===
Methylotrophs use the electron transport chain to conserve energy produced from the oxidation of $\ce{C1}$ compounds. An additional activation step is required in methanotrophic metabolism to allow degradation of chemically-stable methane. This oxidation to methanol is catalyzed by MMO, which incorporates one oxygen atom from $\ce{O2}$ into methane and reduces the other oxygen atom to water, requiring two equivalents of reducing power. Methanol is then oxidized to formaldehyde through the action of methanol dehydrogenase (MDH) in bacteria, or a non-specific alcohol oxidase in yeast. Electrons from methanol oxidation are passed to a membrane-associated quinone of the electron transport chain to produce $\ce{ATP}$.

In dissimilatory processes, formaldehyde is completely oxidized to $\ce{CO2}$ and excreted. Formaldehyde is oxidized to formate via the action of Formaldehyde dehydrogenase (FALDH), which provides electrons directly to a membrane associated quinone of the electron transport chain, usually cytochrome b or c. In the case of $\ce{NAD+}$ associated dehydrogenases, $\ce{NADH}$ is produced.

Finally, formate is oxidized to $\ce{CO2}$ by cytoplasmic or membrane-bound Formate dehydrogenase (FDH), producing $\ce{NADH}$ and $\ce{CO2}$.

=== Anabolism ===
The main metabolic challenge for methylotrophs is the assimilation of single carbon units into biomass. Through de novo synthesis, methylotrophs must form carbon-carbon bonds between 1-Carbon ($\ce{C1}$) molecules. This is an energy intensive process, which facultative methylotrophs avoid by using a range of larger organic compounds. However, obligate methylotrophs must assimilate $\ce{C1}$ molecules. There are four distinct assimilation pathways with the common theme of generating one $\ce{C3}$ molecule. Bacteria use three of these pathways while Fungi use one. All four pathways incorporate 3 $\ce{C1}$ molecules into multi-carbon intermediates, then cleave one intermediate into a new $\ce{C3}$ molecule. The remaining intermediates are rearranged to regenerate the original multi-carbon intermediates.

==== Bacteria ====
Each species of methylotrophic bacteria has a single dominant assimilation pathway. The three characterized pathways for carbon assimilation are the ribulose monophosphate (RuMP) and serine pathways of formaldehyde assimilation as well as the ribulose bisphosphate (RuBP) pathway of CO_{2} assimilation.

===== Ribulose bisphosphate (RuBP) cycle =====
Unlike the other assimilatory pathways, bacteria using the RuBP pathway derive all of their organic carbon from $\ce{CO2}$ assimilation. This pathway was first elucidated in photosynthetic autotrophs and is better known as the Calvin Cycle. Shortly thereafter, methylotrophic bacteria who could grow on reduced $\ce{C1}$ compounds were found using this pathway.

First, 3 molecules of ribulose 5-phosphate are phosphorylated to ribulose 1,5-bisphosphate (RuBP). The enzyme ribulose bisphosphate carboxylase (RuBisCO) carboxylates these RuBP molecules which produces 6 molecules of 3-phosphoglycerate (PGA). The enzyme phosphoglycerate kinase phosphorylates PGA into 1,3-diphosphoglycerate (DPGA). Reduction of 6 DPGA by the enzyme glyceraldehyde phosphate dehydrogenase generates 6 molecules of the $\ce{C3}$ compound glyceraldehyde-3-phosphate (GAP). One GAP molecule is diverted towards biomass while the other 5 molecules regenerate the 3 molecules of ribulose 5-phosphate.

===== Ribulose monophosphate (RuMP) cycle =====
RuMP pathway in type I methanotrophs

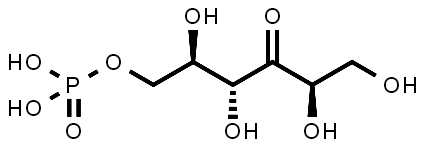
3-hexulose 6-phosphate (hexulose phosphate)

A new pathway was suspected when RuBisCO was not found in the methanotroph Methylmonas methanica. Through radio-labelling experiments, it was shown that M. methanica used the ribulose monophosphate (RuMP) pathway. This has led researchers to propose that the RuMP cycle may have preceded the RuBP cycle.

Like the RuBP cycle, this cycle begins with 3 molecules of ribulose-5-phosphate. However, instead of phosphorylating ribulose-5-phosphate, 3 molecules of formaldehyde form a C-C bond through an aldol condensation, producing 3 $\ce{C6}$ molecules of 3-hexulose 6-phosphate (hexulose phosphate). One of these molecules of hexulose phosphate is converted into GAP and either pyruvate or dihydroxyacetone phosphate (DHAP). The pyruvate or DHAP is used towards biomass while the other 2 hexulose phosphate molecules and the molecule of GAP are used to regenerate the 3 molecules of ribulose-5-phosphate.

===== Serine cycle =====
Unlike the other assimilatory pathways, the serine cycle uses carboxylic acids and amino acids as intermediates instead of carbohydrates. First, 2 molecules of formaldehyde are added to 2 molecules of the amino acid glycine. This produces two molecules of the amino acid serine, the key intermediate of this pathway. These serine molecules eventually produce 2 molecules of 2-phosphoglycerate, with one $\ce{C3}$ molecule going towards biomass and the other being used to regenerate glycine. Notably, the regeneration of glycine requires a molecule of $\ce{CO2}$ as well, therefore the Serine pathway also differs from the other 3 pathways by its requirement of both formaldehyde and $\ce{CO2}$.

==== Yeasts ====
Methylotrophic yeast metabolism differs from bacteria primarily on the basis of the enzymes used and the carbon assimilation pathway. Unlike bacteria which use bacterial MDH, methylotrophic yeasts oxidize methanol in their peroxisomes with a non-specific alcohol oxidase. This produces formaldehyde as well as hydrogen peroxide. Compartmentalization of this reaction in peroxisomes likely sequesters the hydrogen peroxide produced. Catalase is produced in the peroxisomes to deal with this harmful by-product.

Among yeasts, the family Pichiaceae is known as the "methylotrophs clade" for their ability to utilize methanol, conferred by a common insertion of the MOX1 (also known as AOX1) methanol oxidase gene.

===== Dihydroxyacteone (DHA) cycle =====
The dihydroxyacetone (DHA) pathway, also known as the D-xylulose monophosphate (XuMP) pathway, is found exclusively in yeast. This pathway assimilates three molecules of formaldehyde into 1 molecule of DHAP using 3 molecules of D-xylulose 5-phosphate as the key intermediate.

D-xylulose-5-phosphoric acid
+ H_{2}C=O
glyceraldehyde 3-phosphate
+
dihydroxyacetone

Formaldehyde transketolase (DHA synthase) acts as a transferase (transketolase) to transfer part of D-xylulose 5-phosphate to DHA. Then these 3 molecules of DHA are phosphorylated to DHAP by triokinase. Like the other cycles, 3 $\ce{C3}$ molecules are produced with 1 molecule being directed for use as cell material. The other 2 molecules are used to regenerate xylulose 5-phosphate.

== Environmental Implications ==
As key players in the carbon cycle, methylotrophs work to reduce global warming primarily through the uptake of methane and other greenhouse gases. In aqueous environments, methanogenic archaea produce 40-50% of the world's methane. Symbiosis between methanogens and methanotrophic bacteria greatly decreases the amount of methane released into the atmosphere.

This symbiosis is also important in the marine environment. Marine bacteria are very important to food webs and biogeochemical cycles, particularly in coastal surface waters but also in other key ecosystems such as hydrothermal vents. There is evidence of widespread and diverse groups of methylotrophs in the ocean that have potential to significantly impact marine and estuarine ecosystems. One-carbon compounds used as a carbon and energy source by methylotrophs are found throughout the ocean. These compounds include methane, methanol, methylated amines, methyl halides, and methylated sulfur compounds, such as dimethylsulfide (DMS) and dimethylsulfoxide (DMSO). Some of these compounds are produced by phytoplankton and some come from the atmosphere. Studies incorporating a wider range of one-carbon substrates have found increasing diversity of methylotrophs, suggesting that the diversity of this bacterial group has not yet fully been explored.

Because these compounds are volatile and impact the climate and atmosphere, research on the interaction of these bacteria with these one-carbon compounds can also help understanding of air-sea fluxes of these compounds, which impact climate predictions. For example, it is uncertain whether the ocean acts as a net source or sink of atmospheric methanol, but a diverse set of methylotrophs use methanol as their main energy source. In some regions, methylotrophs have been found to be a net sink of methanol, while in others a product of methylotroph activity, methylamine, has been found to be emitted from the ocean and form aerosols. The net direction of these fluxes depends on the utilization by methylotrophs.

Studies have found that methylotrophic capacity varies with the productivity of a system, so the impacts of methylotrophy are likely seasonal. Because some of the one-carbon compounds used by methylotrophs, such as methanol and TMAO, are produced by phytoplankton, their availability will vary temporally and seasonally depending on phytoplankton blooms, weather events, and other ecosystem inputs. This means that methylotrophic metabolism is expected to follow similar dynamics, which will then impact biogeochemical cycles and carbon fluxes.

Impacts of methylotrophs were also found in deep-sea hydrothermal vents. Methylotrophs, along with sulfur oxidizers and iron oxidizers, expressed key proteins associated with carbon fixation. These types of studies will contribute to further understanding of deep sea carbon cycling and the connectivity between deep ocean and surface carbon cycling. The expansion of omics technologies has accelerated research on the diversity of methylotrophs, their abundance and activity in a variety of environmental niches, and their interspecies interactions. Further research must be done on these bacteria and the overall effect of bacterial drawdown and transformation of one-carbon compounds in the ocean. Current evidence points to a potentially substantial role for methylotrophs in the ocean in the cycling of carbon but also potentially in the global nitrogen, sulfur and phosphorus cycles as well as the air-sea flux of carbon compounds, which could have global climate impacts.

The use of methylotrophs in the agricultural sector is another way in which they can potentially impact the environment. Traditional chemical fertilizers supply nutrients not readily available from soil but can have some negative environmental impacts and are costly to produce. Methylotrophs have high potential as alternative biofertilizers and bioinoculants due to their ability to form mutualistic relationships with several plant species. Methylotrophs provide plants with nutrients such as soluble phosphorus and fixed nitrogen and also play a role in the uptake of said nutrients. Additionally, they can help plants respond to environmental stressors through the production of phytohormones. Methylotrophic growth also inhibits the growth of harmful plant pathogens and induces systemic resistance. Methylotrophic biofertilizers used either alone or together with chemical fertilizers have been shown to increase both crop yield and quality without loss of nutrients.
