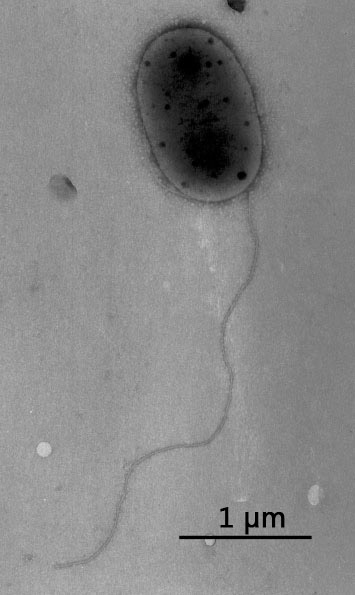

Scientific classification
- Domain: Bacteria
- Kingdom: Pseudomonadati
- Phylum: Pseudomonadota
- Class: Alphaproteobacteria
- Order: Hyphomicrobiales
- Family: Methylobacteriaceae; Garrity et al. 2006

Genera
- Enterovirga Chen et al. 2017; Methylobacterium Patt et al. 1976 (Approved Lists 1980); Methylorubrum Green and Ardley 2018; Microvirga Kanso and Patel 2003; Psychroglaciecola Qu et al. 2014

= Methylobacteriaceae =

Family of bacteria

The Methylobacteriaceae are a family of Hyphomicrobiales.
