= Bronze =

Alloy of copper and tin

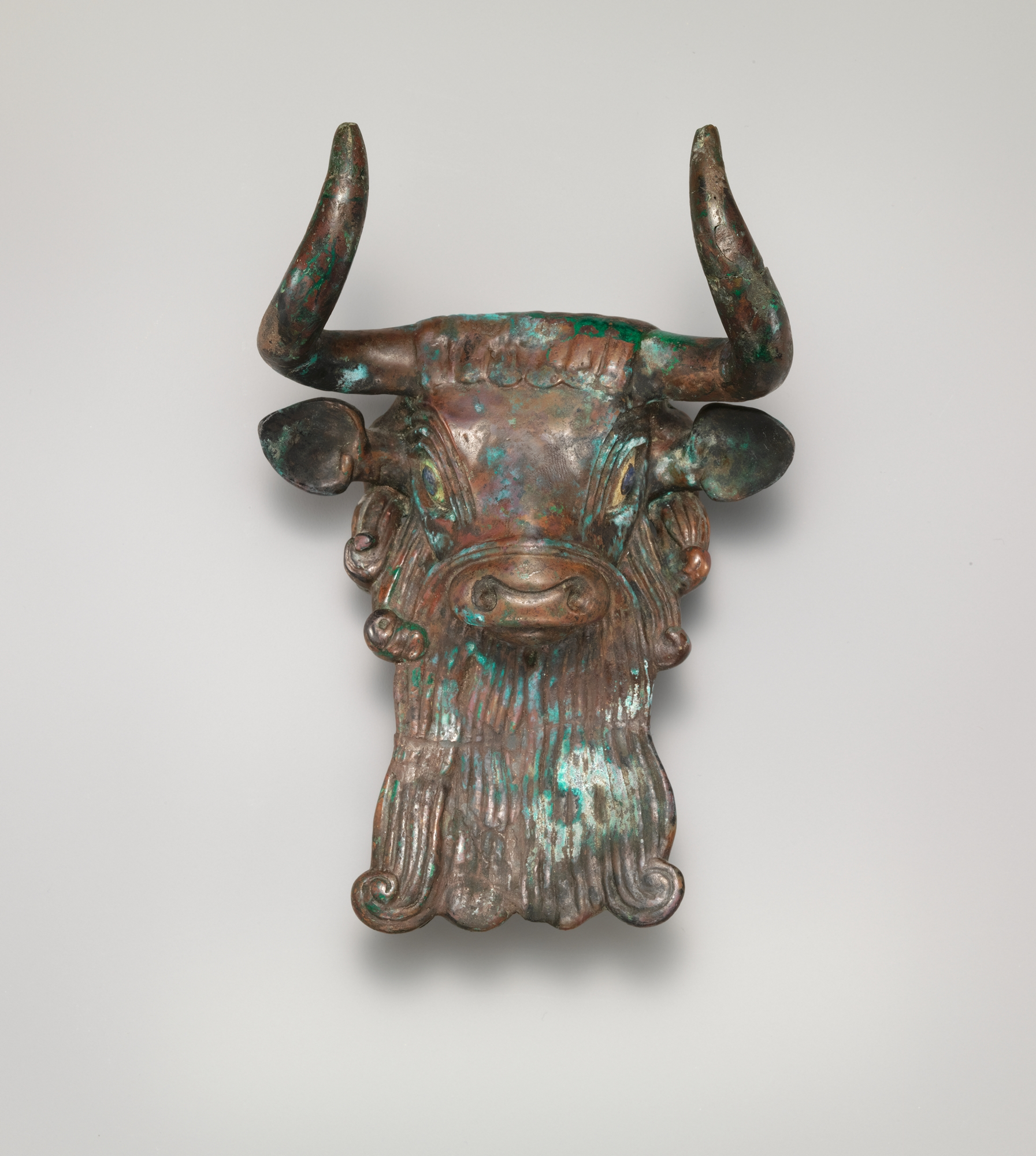
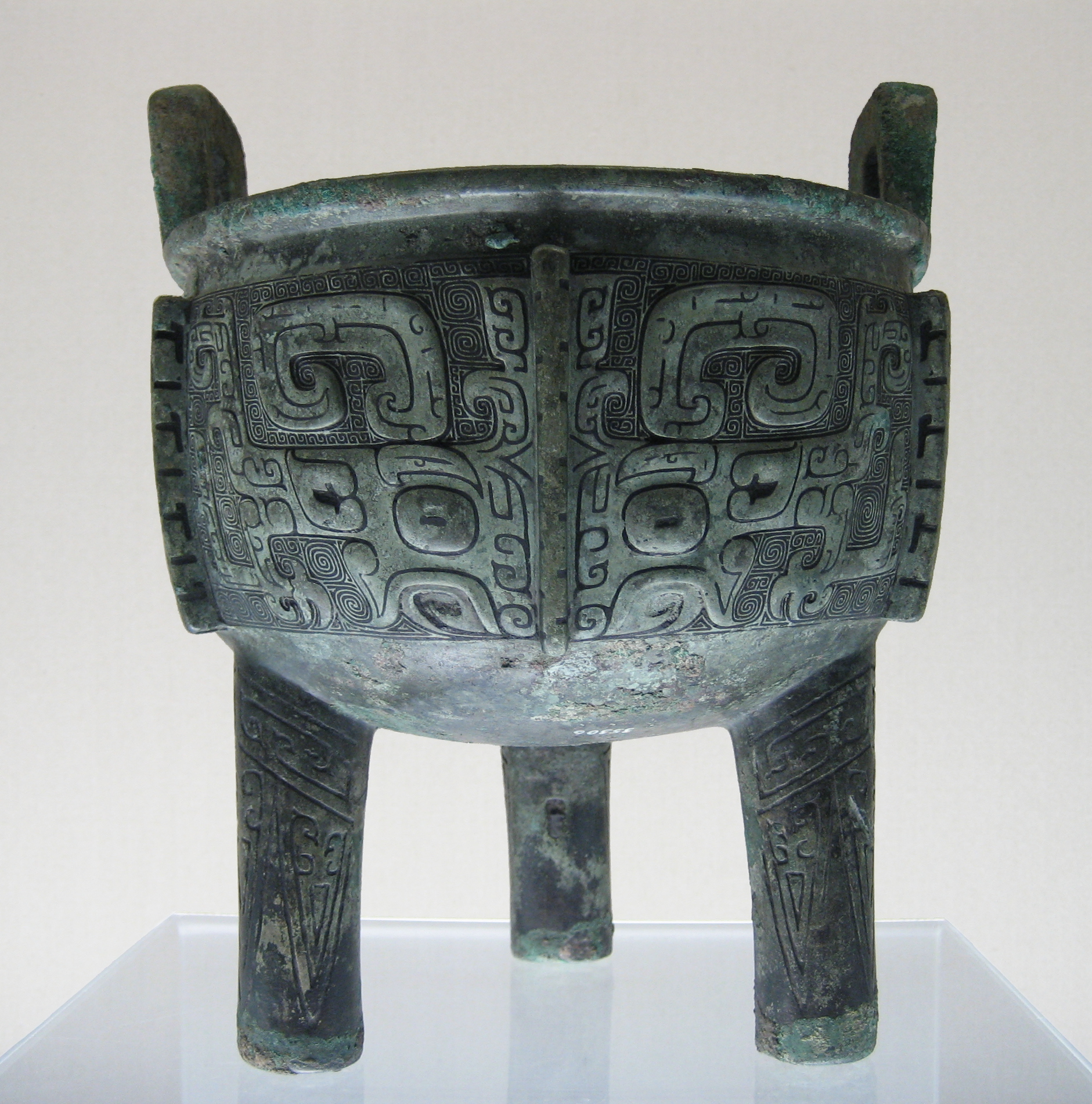
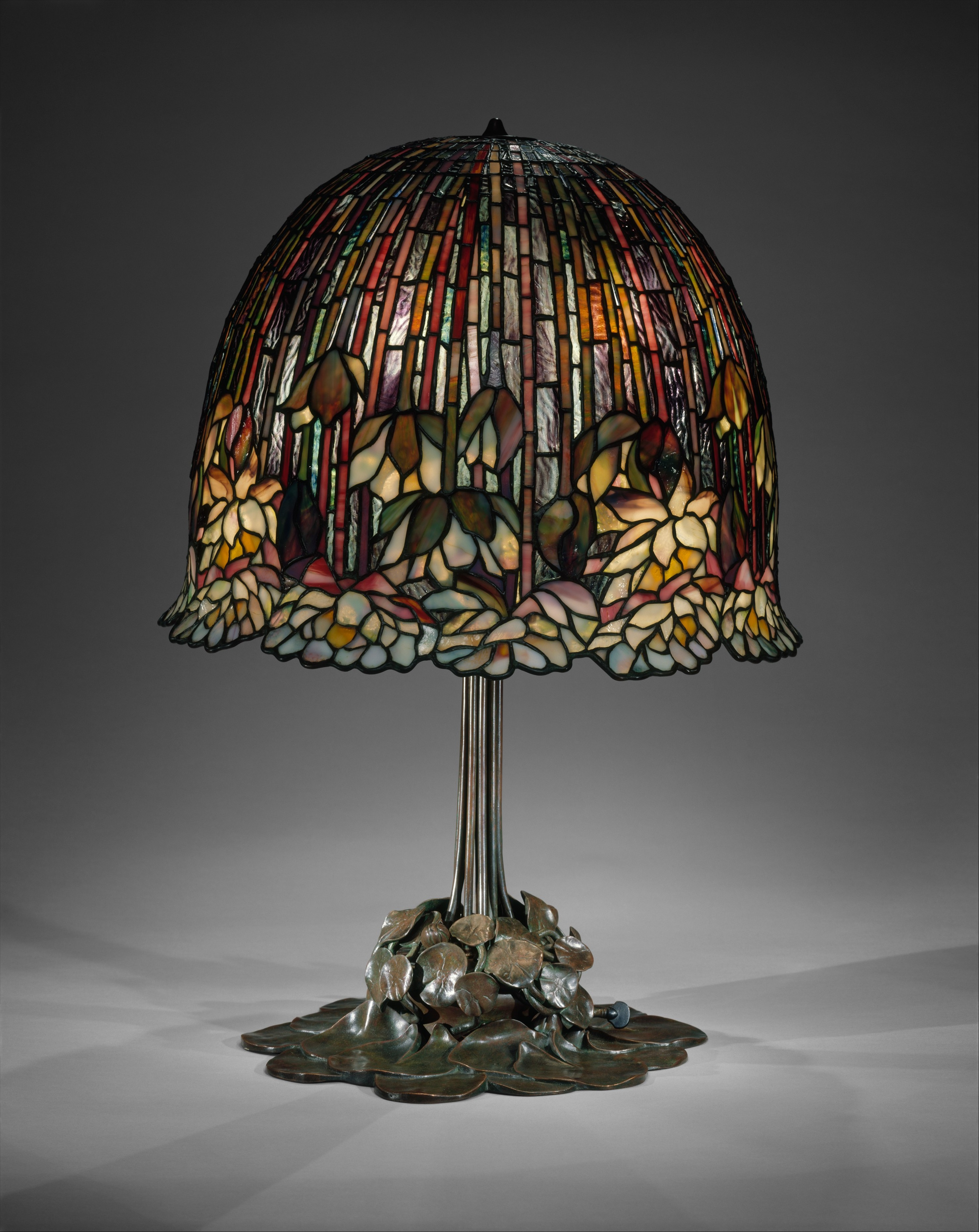
Various examples of bronze artwork throughout history

Bronze is an alloy consisting primarily of copper, commonly with about 12–12.5% tin and often with the addition of other metals (including aluminium, manganese, nickel, or zinc) and sometimes non-metals (such as phosphorus) or metalloids (such as arsenic or silicon). These additions produce a range of alloys some of which are harder than copper alone or have other useful properties, such as strength, ductility, or machinability.

The archaeological period during which bronze was the hardest metal in widespread use is known as the Bronze Age. The beginning of the Bronze Age in western Eurasia is conventionally dated to the mid-4th millennium BCE and early 2nd millennium BCE in China; elsewhere, it gradually spread across regions. The Bronze Age was followed by the Iron Age, which started in about 1300 BCE and reached most of Eurasia by about 500 BCE, although bronze continued to be much more widely used than it is in modern times.

Because historical artworks were often made of bronzes (alloyed with tin) and brasses (alloyed with zinc), and old documentation sometimes confused the two terms, modern museum and scholarly descriptions of older artworks increasingly use the generalized term "copper alloy" instead of the names of individual alloys. This is done (at least in part) to prevent database searches from failing merely because of errors or disagreements in the naming of historic copper alloys.

== Etymology ==
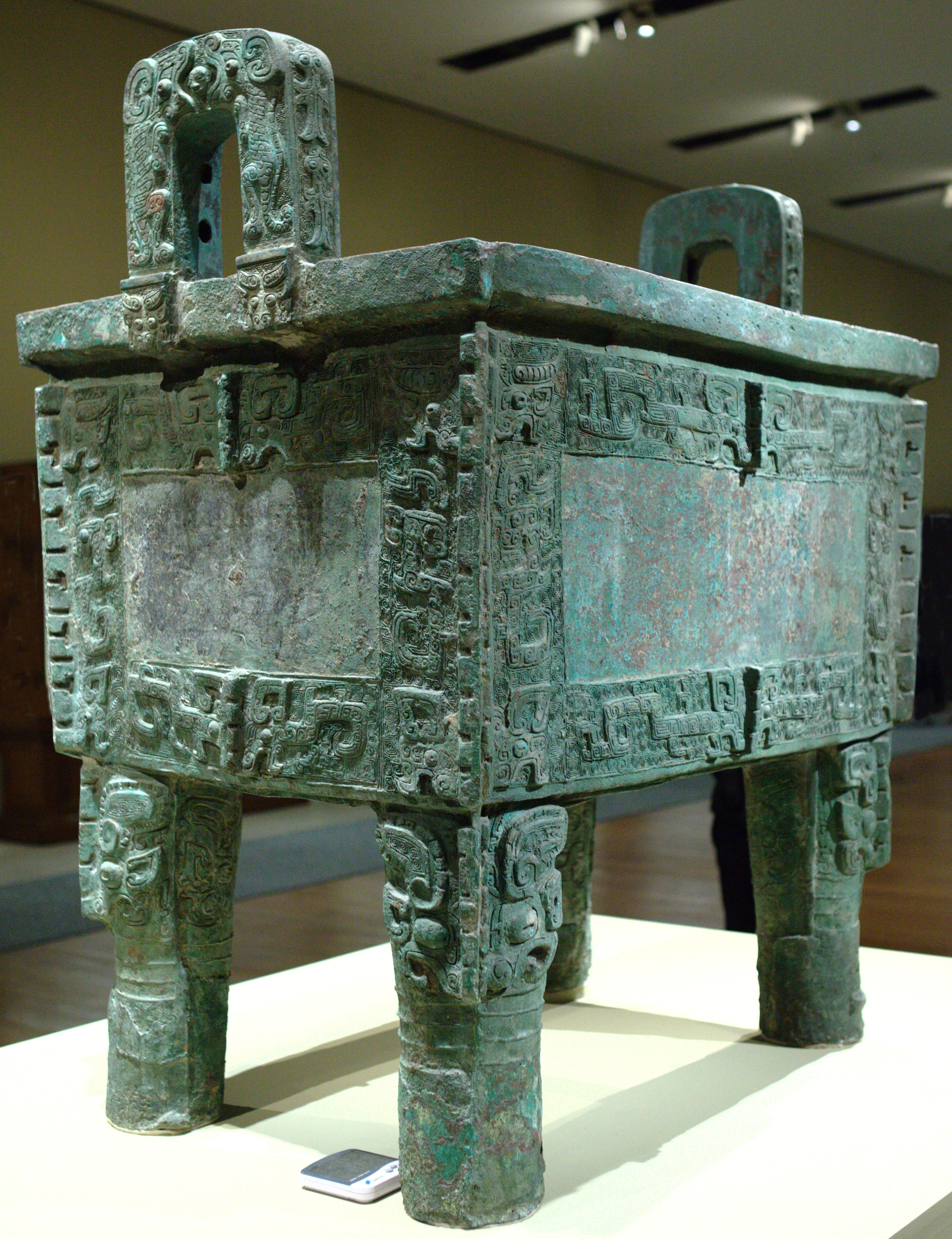
Houmuwu ding (Chinese: 后母戊鼎; pinyin: Hòumǔwù dǐng), the heaviest Chinese ritual bronze ever found; 1300–1046 BC; National Museum of China (Beijing). This ding's name is based on the inscription in the bronze interior wall, which reads Hòumǔwù 'Queen Mother Wu'.

The word bronze (1730–1740) is borrowed from Middle French bronze (1511), itself borrowed from Italian bronzo 'bell metal, brass' (13th century, transcribed in Medieval Latin as bronzium) from either:

- bróntion, back-formation from Byzantine Greek brontēsíon (βροντησίον, 11th century), perhaps from Brentḗsion (Βρεντήσιον 'Brindisi'), reputed for its bronze; or originally:
- in its earliest form from Middle Persian brinǰ (also bring) 'bronze, brass' (Iranian Persian برنج berenj), from which Georgian brinǯi (ბრინჯი), Turkish pirinç, and Armenian brinj (բրինձ), all meaning 'copper' or 'bronze', as well, have also been borrowed.

A Dictionary of the English Language (1746) offers: "a composition of copper and tin makes bell metal; and copper and brass; melted in equal quantities, produces what the French call bronze, used for figures and statues. Chambers".

Webster's Dictionary (1828) offers: "Tin united with copper in different proportions, forms bronze, bell-metal, and speculum-metal. D. Olmsted".

Chambers Dictionary (1872) offers: "Bronze, bronz, n. an alloy of copper and tin, of a brown or burned colour;"

== History ==
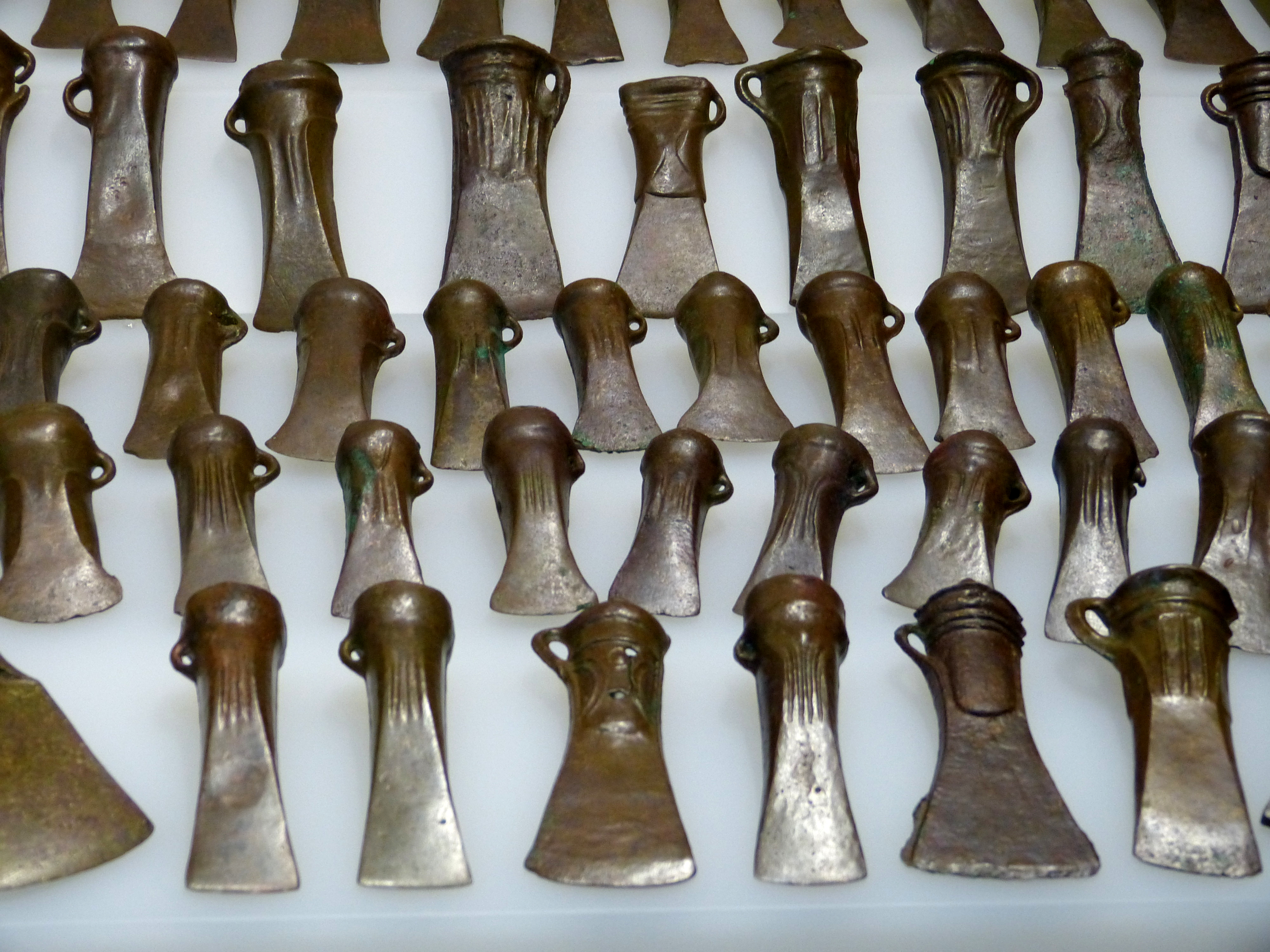
Hoard of bronze socketed axes from the Bronze Age found in modern Germany. This was the most common tool of the period, and also seems to have been used as a store of value.

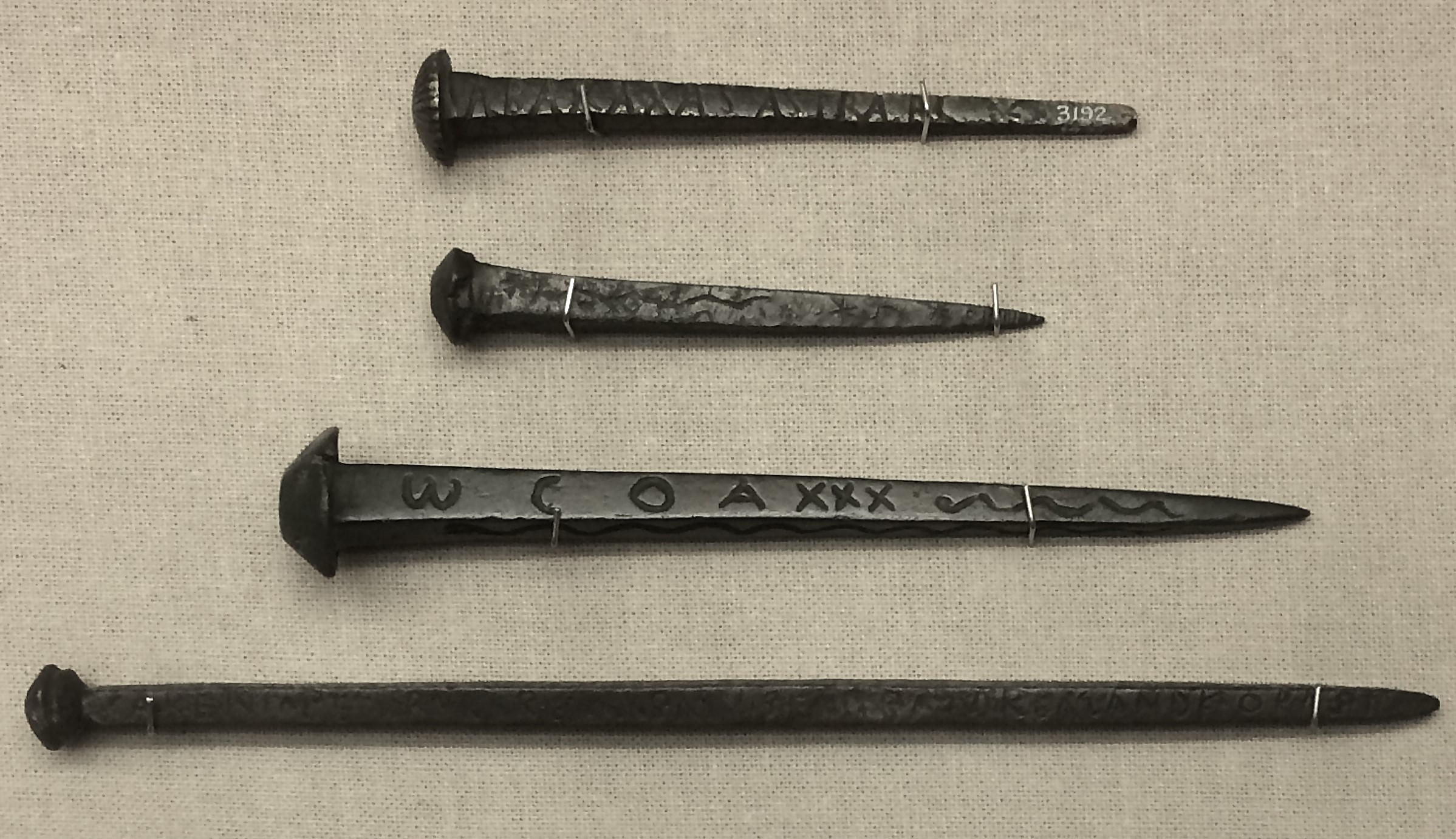
Roman bronze nails with magical signs and inscriptions, 3rd-4th century AD

The discovery of bronze enabled people to create metal objects that were harder and more durable than had previously been possible. Bronze tools, weapons, armor, and building materials such as decorative tiles were harder and more durable than their stone and copper ("Chalcolithic") predecessors.

The earliest tin-copper-alloy artifact has been dated to c. 4650 BCE, in a Vinča culture site in Pločnik (Serbia), and believed to have been smelted from a natural tin-copper ore, stannite. Other early examples date to the late 4th millennium BCE in Egypt, Susa (Iran) and some ancient sites in Luristan (Iran), Tepe Sialk (Iran), Mundigak (Afghanistan), and Mesopotamia (Iraq).

Copper–arsenic alloys, from naturally or artificially mixed ores of those metals, forming arsenical bronze, were found to result in a metal of a silver hue, with similarly increased strength, a lower melting point, and simpler to work, than pure copper. The earliest known arsenic–copper alloy artifacts come from a Yahya Culture (Period V 3800–3400 BCE) site, at Tal-i-Iblis on the Iranian plateau, and were smelted from native arsenical copper and copper-arsenides, such as algodonite and domeykite.

Tin became the major non-copper ingredient of bronze in the late 3rd millennium BCE. Tin bronze was superior to arsenic copper in that the alloying process could be more easily controlled, and the resulting alloy was stronger and easier to cast. Also, unlike those of arsenic, metallic tin and the fumes from tin refining are not toxic.

Ores of copper and tin, which is much rarer, are not often found together (exceptions include Cornwall in the United Kingdom, one ancient site in Thailand and one in Iran), so serious bronze work has always involved trade with other regions. Tin sources and trade in ancient times had a major influence on the development of cultures. In Europe, a major source of tin was the British deposits of ore in Cornwall, which were traded as far as Phoenicia in the eastern Mediterranean. In many parts of the world, large hoards of bronze artifacts are found, suggesting that bronze also represented a store of value and an indicator of social status. In Europe, large hoards of bronze tools, typically socketed axes (illustrated above), are found, which mostly show no signs of wear. With Chinese ritual bronzes, which are documented in the inscriptions they carry and from other sources, the case is clear. These were made in enormous quantities for elite burials, and also used by the living for ritual offerings.

An analysis of 324 metallic finds of the Indus Valley Civilisation (2600–1900 BCE), in the 1990s, found 67 (20%) to have some tin content, to be considered bronze artifacts, with 26 (8%) of the artifacts having a tin content in excess of 10%, permitting casting; the source of the tin is unknown, but has been speculated to be from Bukhara or Samarkand, in Uzbekistan.

=== Transition to iron ===
Though bronze, whose Vickers hardness is 60–258, is generally harder than wrought iron, with a hardness of 30–80, the Bronze Age gave way to the Iron Age after a serious disruption of the tin trade: the population migrations of around 1200–1100 BCE reduced the shipment of tin around the Mediterranean and from Britain, limiting supplies and raising prices. As the art of working in iron improved, iron became cheaper and improved in quality. As later cultures advanced from hand-wrought iron to machine-forged iron (typically made with trip hammers powered by water), blacksmiths also learned how to make steel, which is stronger and harder than bronze and holds a sharper edge longer. Bronze was still used during the Iron Age and has continued in use for many purposes to the modern day.

== Composition ==
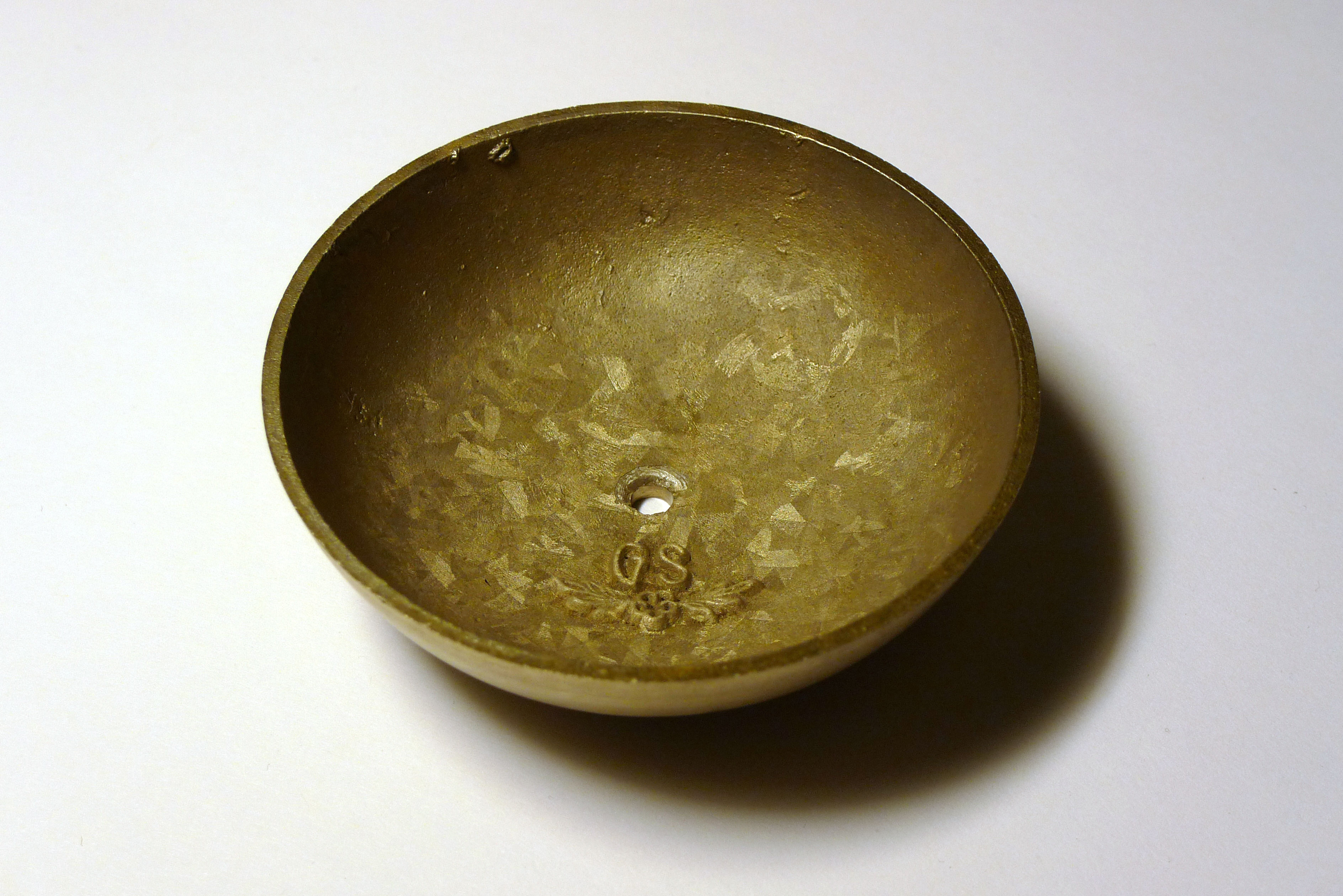
Bronze bell with a visible crystallite structure

There are many different bronze alloys, but typically modern bronze is about 88% copper and 12% tin. Alpha bronze consists of the alpha solid solution of tin in copper. Alpha bronze alloys of 4–5% tin are used to make coins, springs, turbines and blades. Historical "bronzes" are highly variable in composition, as most metalworkers probably used whatever scrap was on hand; the metal of the 12th-century English Gloucester Candlestick is bronze containing a mixture of copper, zinc, tin, lead, nickel, iron, antimony, arsenic and an unusually large amount of silver – between 22.5% in the base and 5.76% in the pan below the candle. The proportions of this mixture suggest that the candlestick was made from a hoard of old coins. The 13th-century Benin Bronzes are in fact brass, and the 12th-century Romanesque Baptismal font at St Bartholomew's Church, Liège is sometimes described as bronze and sometimes as brass.

During the Bronze Age, two forms of bronze were commonly used: "classic bronze", about 10% tin, was used in casting; "mild bronze", about 6% tin, was hammered from ingots to make sheets. Bladed weapons were primarily cast from classic bronze while helmets and armor were hammered from mild bronze. Early black powder firearms such as cannon barrels were made from bronze. During the Austro-Hungarian North Pole expedition, the firearms onboard the Arctic exploration ship Admiral Tegetthoff were made completely of bronze as they were seen as an advantage over iron turning brittle at cold temperatures and deemed resistant to saltwater corrosion.

Modern commercial bronze (90% copper and 10% zinc) and architectural bronze (57% copper, 3% lead, 40% zinc) are more properly regarded as brass alloys because they contain zinc as the main alloying ingredient. They are commonly used in architectural applications. Plastic bronze contains a significant quantity of lead, which makes for improved plasticity, and may have been used by the ancient Greeks in ship construction. Silicon bronze has a composition of Si: 2.80–3.80%, Mn: 0.50–1.30%, Fe: 0.80% max., Zn: 1.50% max., Pb: 0.05% max., Cu: balance. Other bronze alloys include aluminium bronze, phosphor bronze, manganese bronze, bell metal, arsenical bronze, speculum metal, bismuth bronze, and cymbal alloys.

== Properties ==
Copper-based alloys have lower melting points than steel or iron and are more readily produced from their constituent metals. They are generally about 10 percent denser than steel, although alloys using aluminium or silicon may be slightly less dense. Bronze conducts heat and electricity better than most steels. Copper-base alloys are generally more costly than steels but less so than nickel-base alloys.

Bronzes are typically ductile alloys and are considerably less brittle than cast iron. Copper and its alloys have a huge variety of uses that reflect their versatile physical, mechanical, and chemical properties. Some common examples are the high electrical conductivity of pure copper, the low-friction properties of bearing bronze, which has a high lead content of 6–8%, the resonant qualities of bell bronze (20% tin, 80% copper), and the resistance to corrosion by seawater of several bronze alloys.

The melting point of bronze is about 950 °C (1,742 °F) but varies depending on the ratio of the alloy components. Bronze is usually nonmagnetic, but certain alloys containing iron or nickel may have magnetic properties. Bronze typically oxidizes only superficially; once a copper oxide layer is formed, the underlying metal is protected from further corrosion. This can be seen on statues from the Hellenistic period. If copper chlorides are formed, a corrosion-mode called "bronze disease" will eventually destroy it completely.

== Uses ==
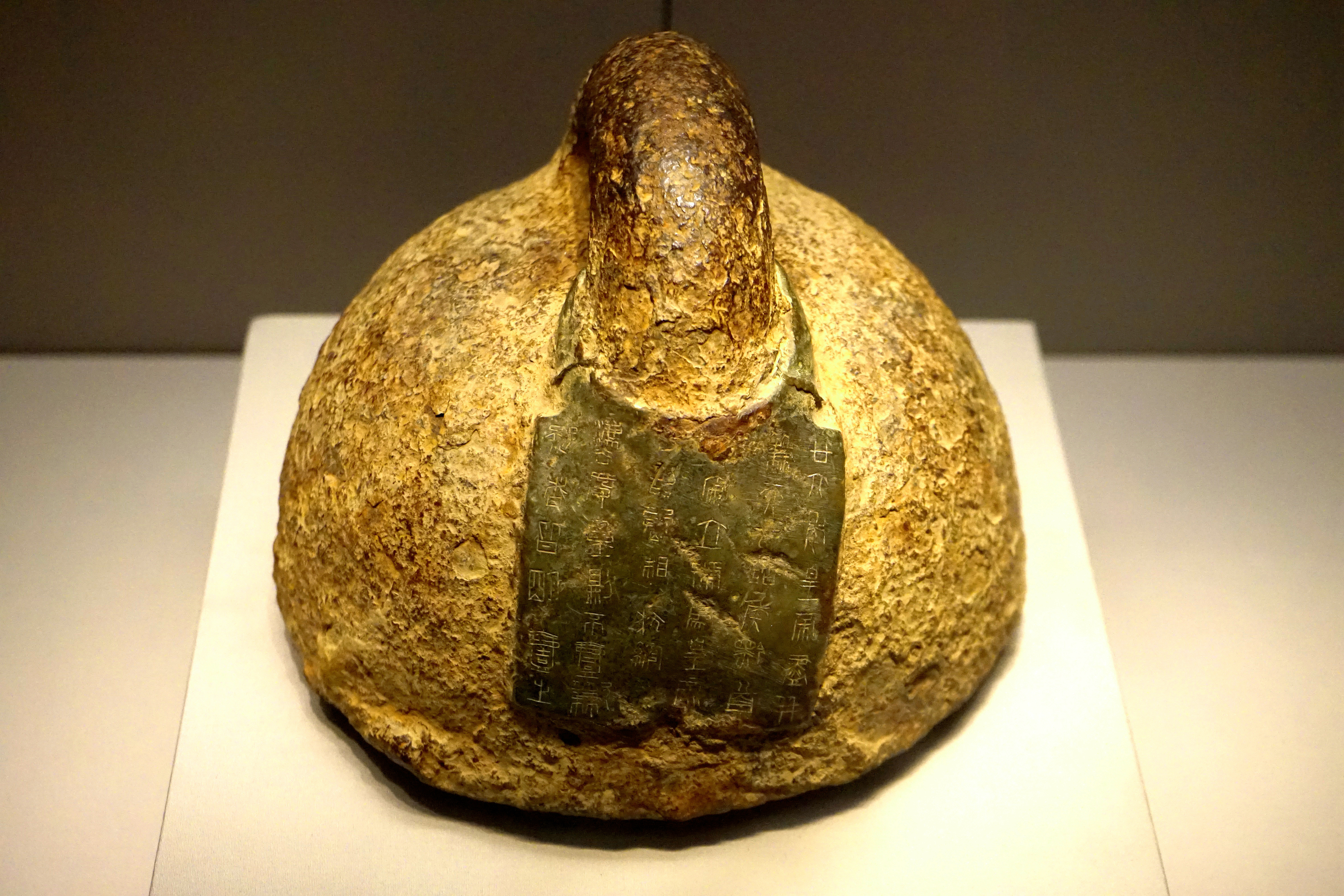
Bronze weight with an inscribed imperial order, Qin dynasty

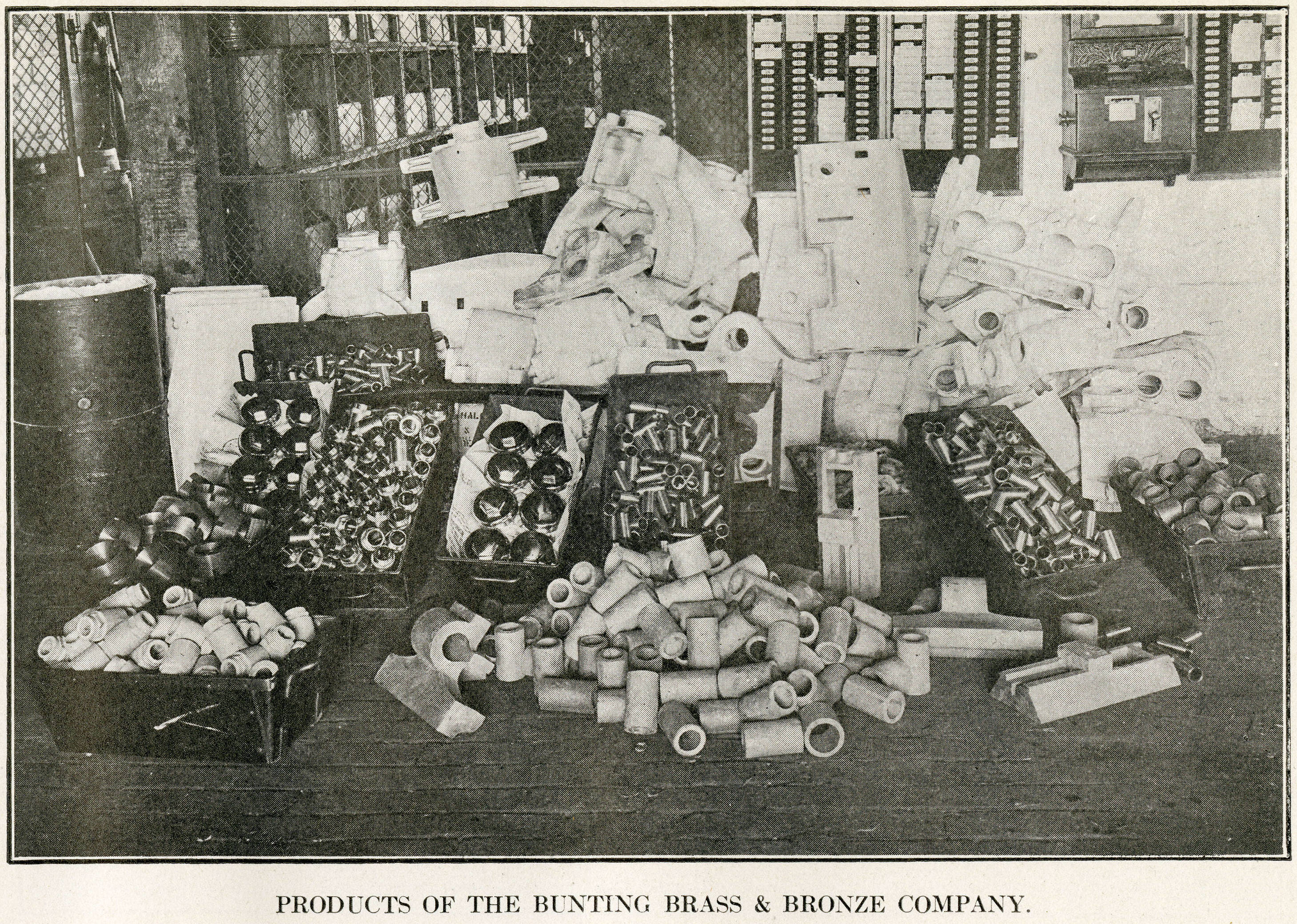
Industrial products of the Bunting Brass and Bronze Company, 1912

Bronze, or bronze-like alloys and mixtures, were used for coins over a longer period. Bronze was especially suitable for use in boat and ship fittings prior to the wide employment of stainless steel owing to its combination of toughness and resistance to salt water corrosion. Bronze is still commonly used in ship propellers and submerged bearings. In the 20th century, silicon was introduced as the primary alloying element, creating an alloy with wide application in industry and the major form used in contemporary statuary. Sculptors may prefer silicon bronze because of the ready availability of silicon bronze brazing rod, which allows color-matched repair of defects in castings. Aluminium is also used for the structural metal aluminium bronze.

Unlike steel, bronze struck against a hard surface will not generate sparks, so it (along with beryllium copper) is used to make hammers, mallets, wrenches and other durable tools to be used in explosive atmospheres or in the presence of flammable vapors. Bronze is used to make bronze wool for woodworking applications where steel wool would discolor oak. Phosphor bronze is used for ships' propellers, musical instruments, and electrical contacts.

Bronze parts are tough and typically used for bearings, clips, electrical connectors and springs. Bronze also has low friction against dissimilar metals, making it important for cannons prior to modern tolerancing, where iron cannonballs would otherwise stick in the barrel.

=== Architectural bronze ===
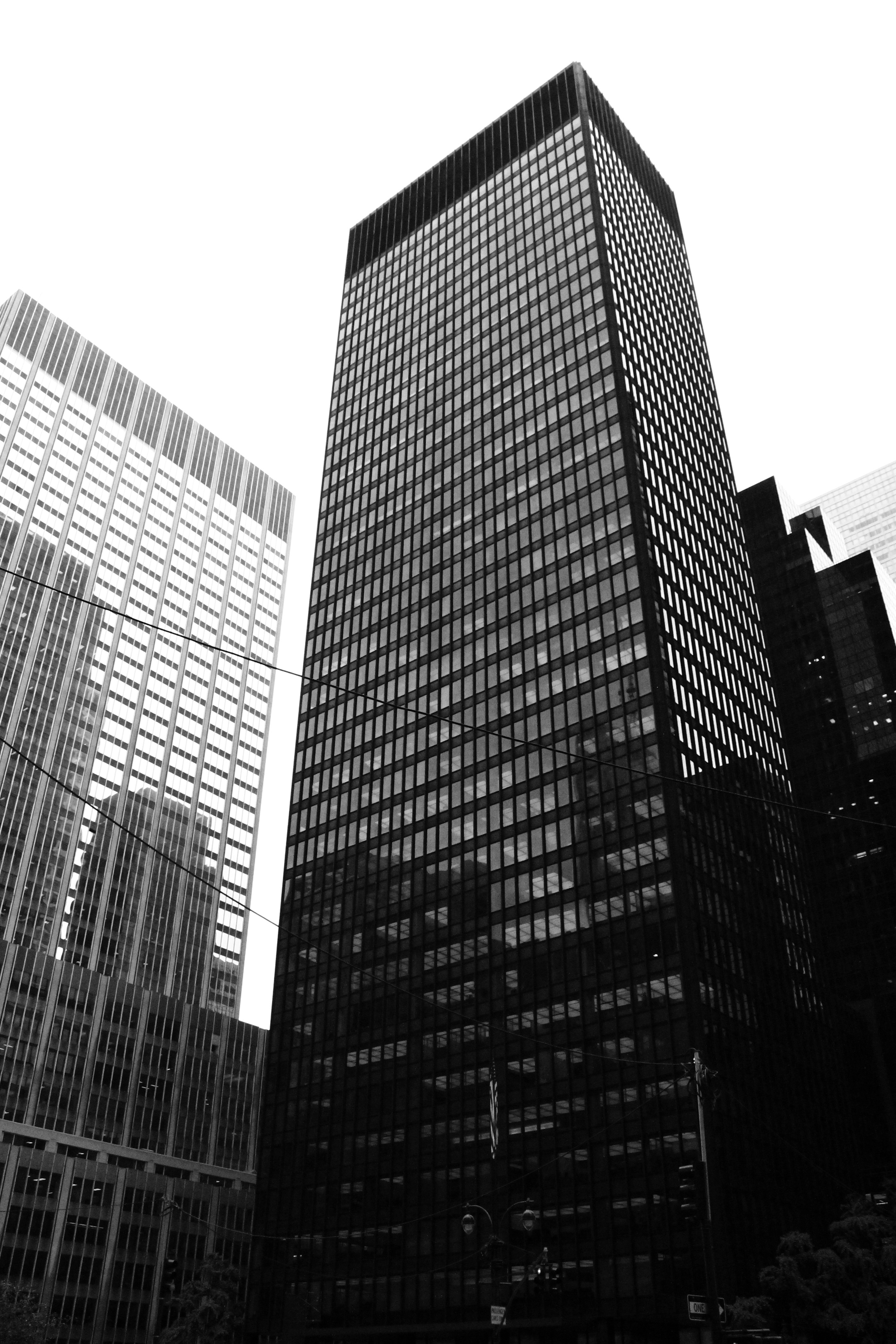
The Seagram Building viewed from across Park Avenue at 52nd Street

The Seagram Building on New York City's Park Avenue is the "iconic glass box sheathed in bronze, designed by Mies van der Rohe." The Seagram Building was the first time that an entire building was sheathed in bronze. The General Bronze Corporation fabricated 3,200,000 pounds (1,600 tons) of bronze at its plant in Garden City, New York. The Seagram Building is a 38-story, 516-foot bronze-and-topaz-tinted glass building. The building looks like a "squarish 38-story tower clad in a restrained curtain wall of metal and glass." "Bronze was selected because of its color, both before and after aging, its corrosion resistance, and its extrusion properties. In 1958, it was the most expensive building of its time, at $36 million, and the first building in the world with floor-to-ceiling glass walls. Mies van der Rohe achieved the crisp edges that were custom-made with specific detailing by General Bronze and "even the screws that hold in the fixed glass-plate windows were made of brass."

=== Coins and medals ===
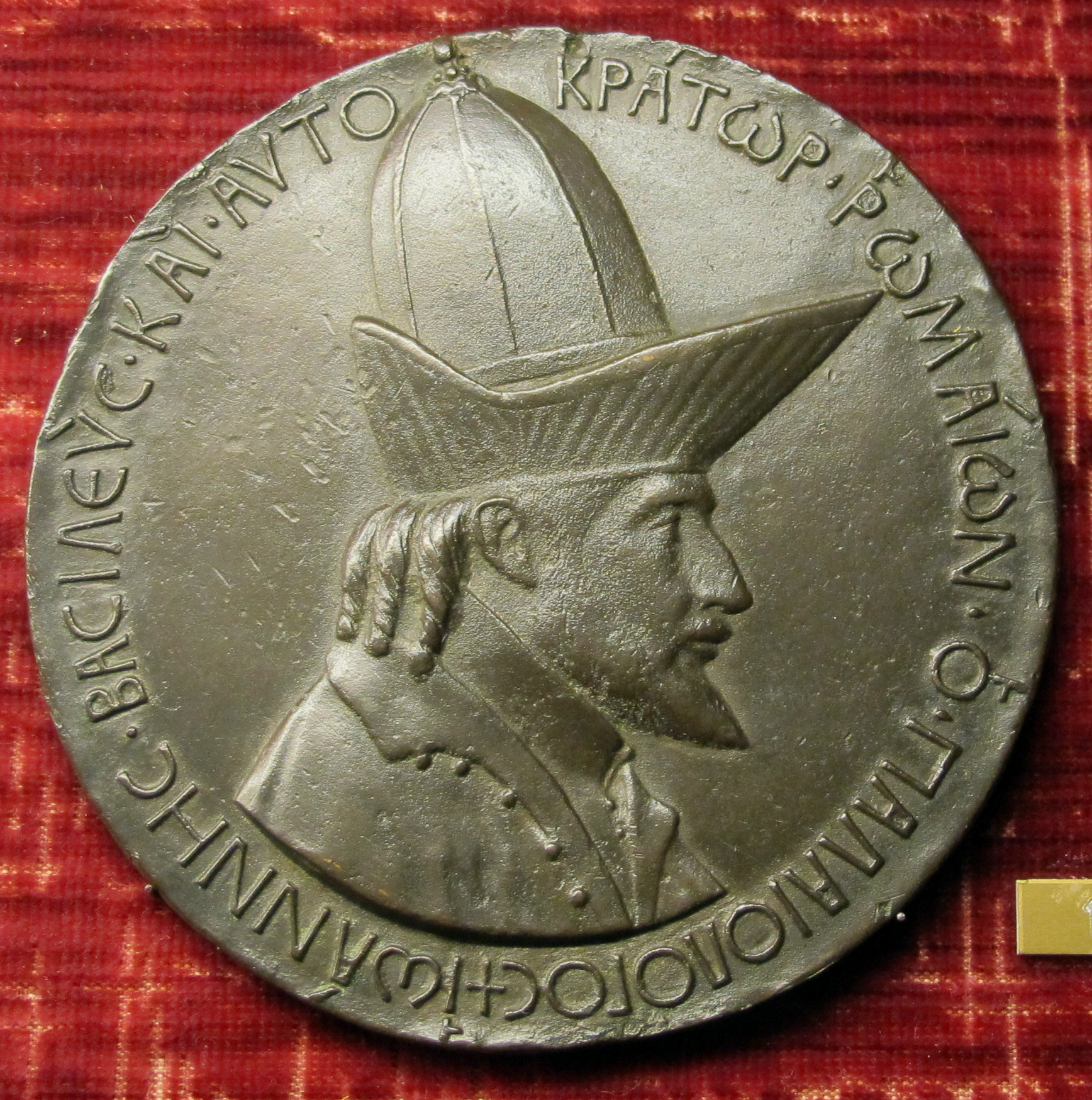
Medal of the Emperor John VIII Palaiologos during his visit to Florence, by Pisanello (1438). The legend reads, in Greek: "John the Palaiologos, basileus and autokrator of the Romans".

Bronze has also been used in coins; most "copper" coins are actually bronze, with about 4 percent tin and 1 percent zinc.

As with coins, bronze has been used in the manufacture of various types of medals for centuries, and "bronze medals" are known in contemporary times for being awarded for third place in sporting competitions and other events. The term is now often used for third place even when no actual bronze medal is awarded. The usage in part arose from the trio of gold, silver and bronze to represent the first three Ages of Man in Greek mythology: the Golden Age, when men lived among the gods; the Silver age, where youth lasted a hundred years; and the Bronze Age, the era of heroes. It was first adopted for a sports event at the 1904 Summer Olympics. At the 1896 event, silver was awarded to winners and bronze to runners-up, while at 1900 other prizes were given rather than medals.

Bronze is the normal material for the related form of the plaquette, normally a rectangular work of art with a scene in relief, for a collectors' market.

Bronze is also associated with eighth wedding anniversaries.

=== Fountains and doors ===
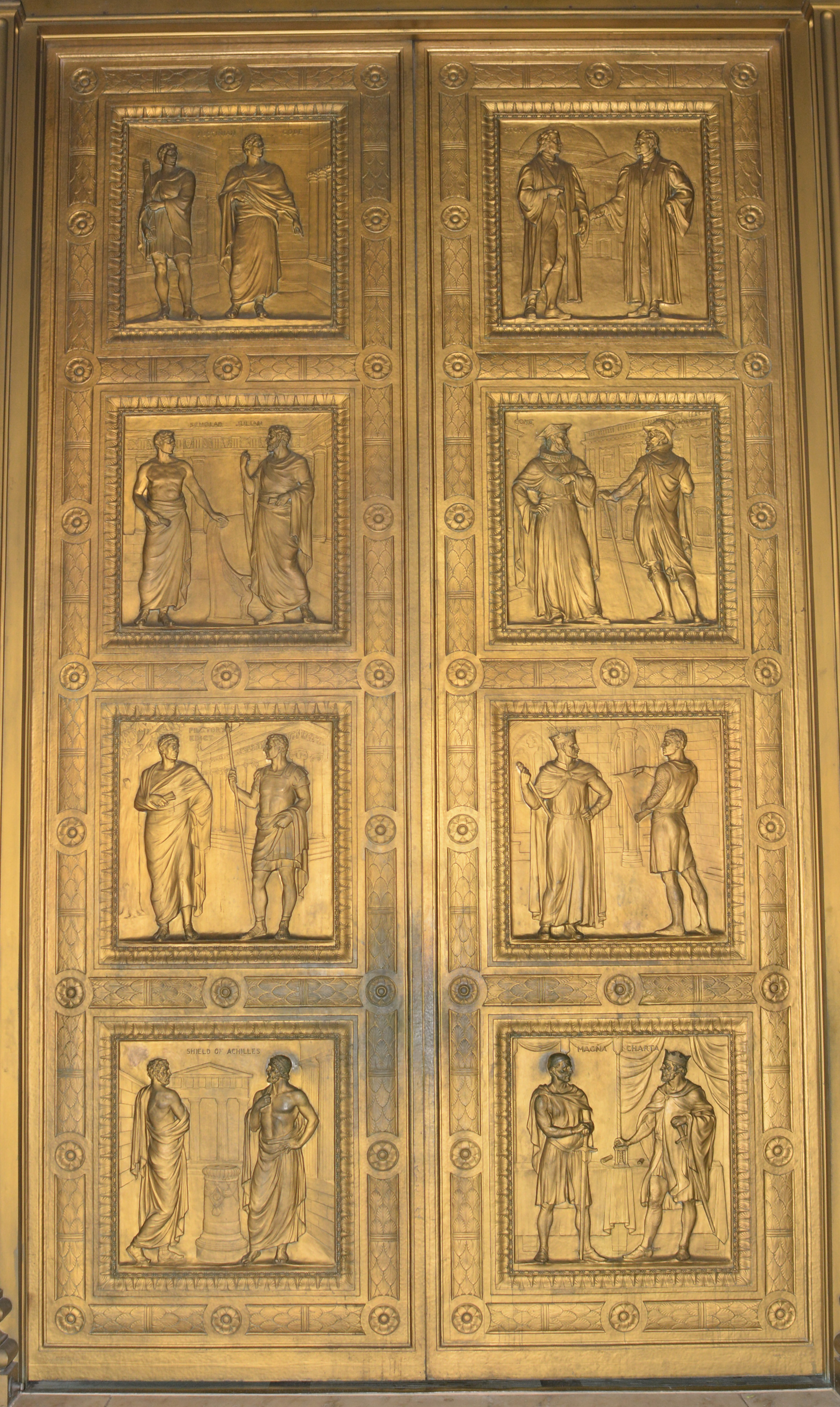
US Supreme Court Building's massive bronze doors by Gilbert Donnelly Sr. and his son John Donnelly Jr.

The largest and most ornate bronze fountain known to be cast in the world was by the Roman Bronze Works and General Bronze Corporation in 1952. The material used for the fountain, known as statuary bronze, is a quaternary alloy made of copper, zinc, tin, and lead, and traditionally golden brown in color. This was made for the Andrew W. Mellon Memorial Fountain in Federal Triangle in Washington, DC. Another example of the massive, ornate design projects of bronze, and attributed to General Bronze/Roman Bronze Works were the massive bronze doors to the United States Supreme Court Building in Washington, DC.

=== Lamps ===
Tiffany Glass Studios, made famous by Louis C. Tiffany commonly referred to his product as favrile glass or "Tiffany glass", and used bronze in their artisan work for his Tiffany lamps.

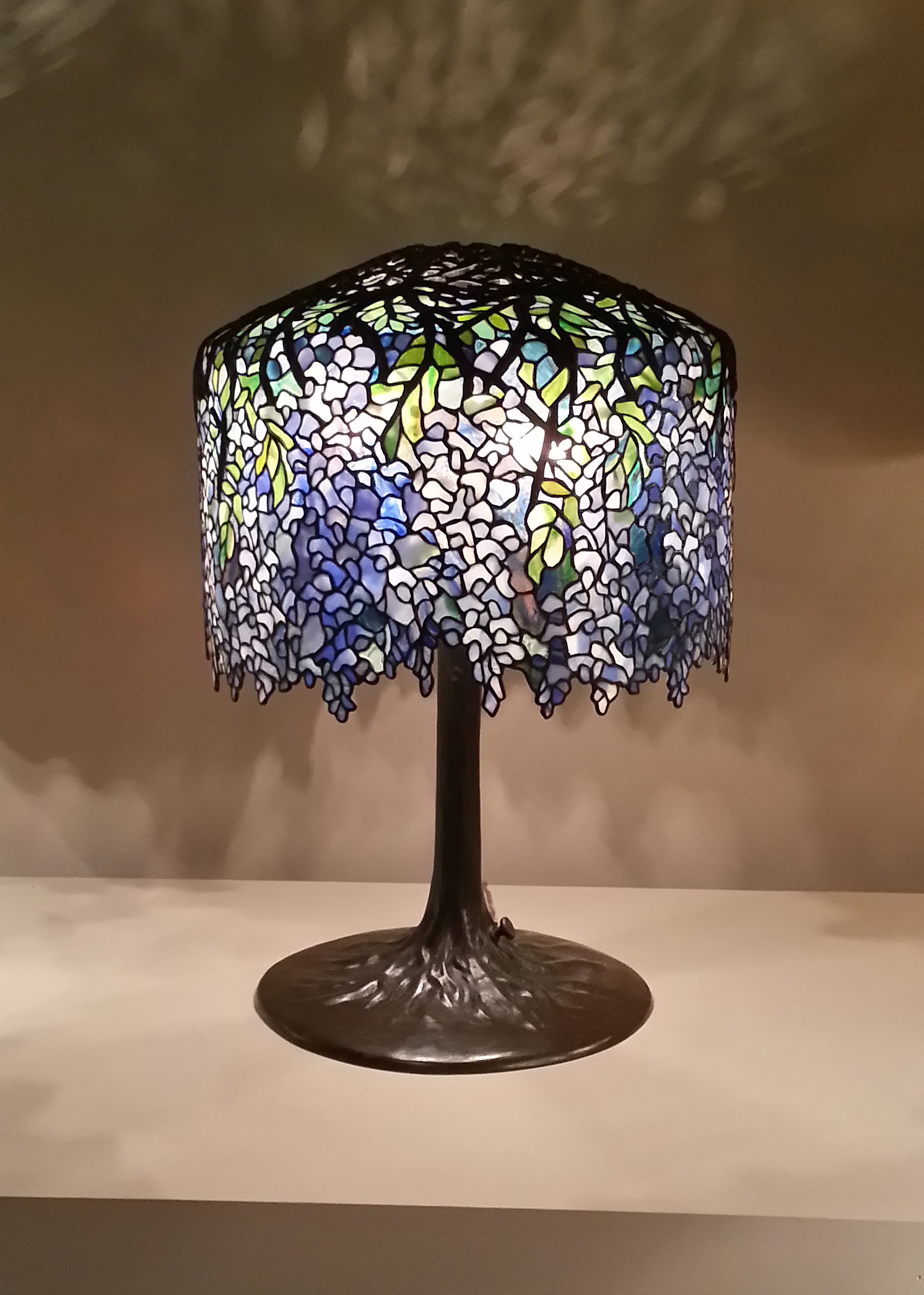
Tiffany table lamp with bronze

=== Mechanical bearings and springs ===
It is still widely used today for springs, bearings, bushings, automobile transmission pilot bearings, and similar fittings, and is particularly common in the bearings of small electric motors. Phosphor bronze is particularly suited to precision-grade bearings and springs. It is also used in guitar and piano strings. Bearings are often made of bronze for its friction properties. It can be impregnated with oil to make the proprietary Oilite and similar material for bearings. Aluminium bronze is hard and wear-resistant, and is used for bearings and machine tool ways. The Doehler Die Casting Co. of Toledo, Ohio, was known for the production of Brastil, a high tensile corrosion resistant bronze alloy.

=== Mirrors ===
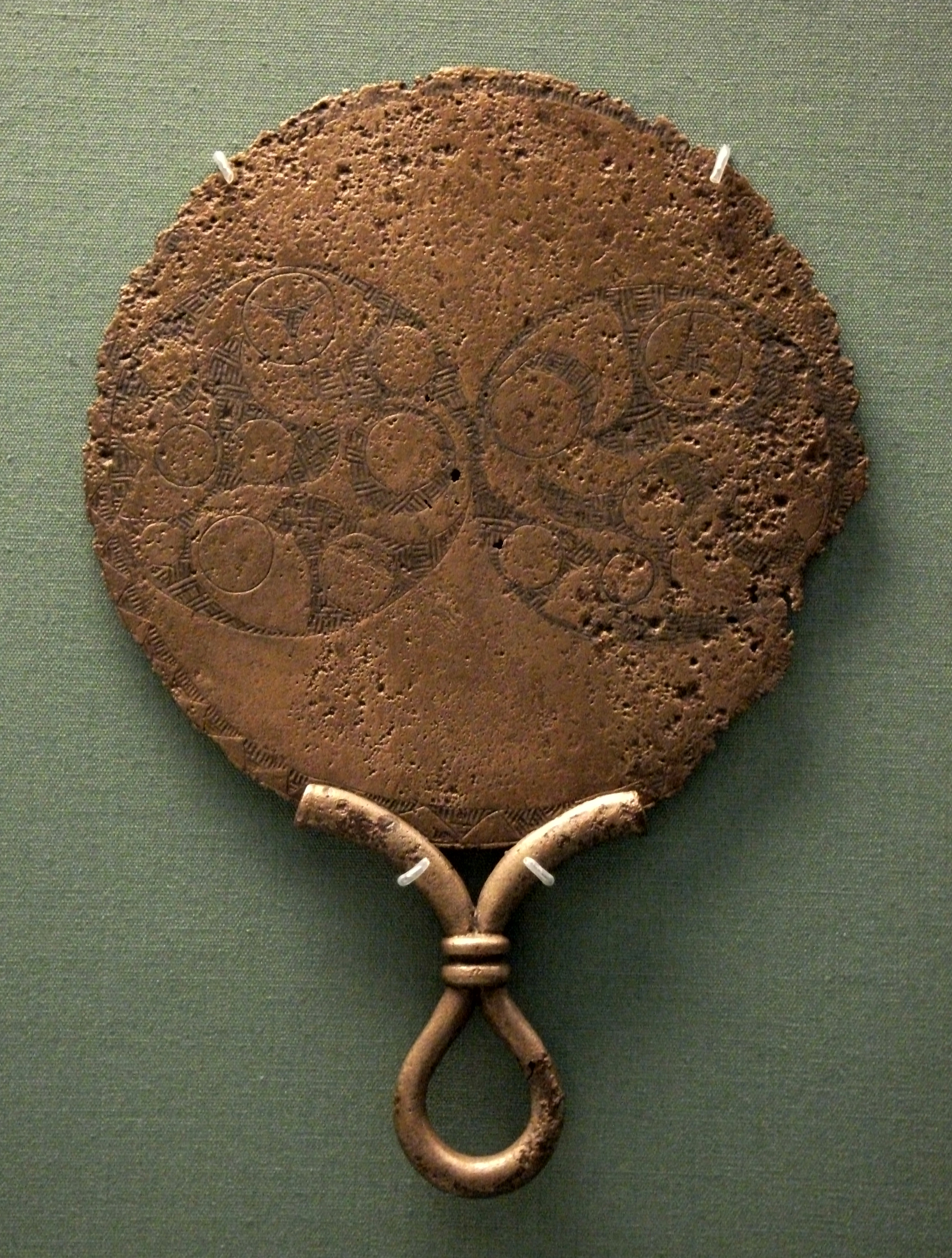
Decorated back of a Celtic bronze mirror, 120–80 BCE, St Keverne, England

Before it became possible to produce glass with acceptably flat surfaces, bronze was a standard material for mirrors. Bronze was used for this purpose in many parts of the world, probably based on independent discoveries. Bronze mirrors survive from the Egyptian Middle Kingdom (2040–1750 BCE), and China from at least c. 550 BCE. In Europe, the Etruscans were making bronze mirrors in the sixth century BCE, and Greek and Roman mirrors followed the same pattern. Although other materials such as speculum metal had come into use, and Western glass mirrors had largely taken over, bronze mirrors were still being made in Japan and elsewhere in the eighteenth century, and are still made on a small scale in Kerala, India.

=== Musical instruments ===
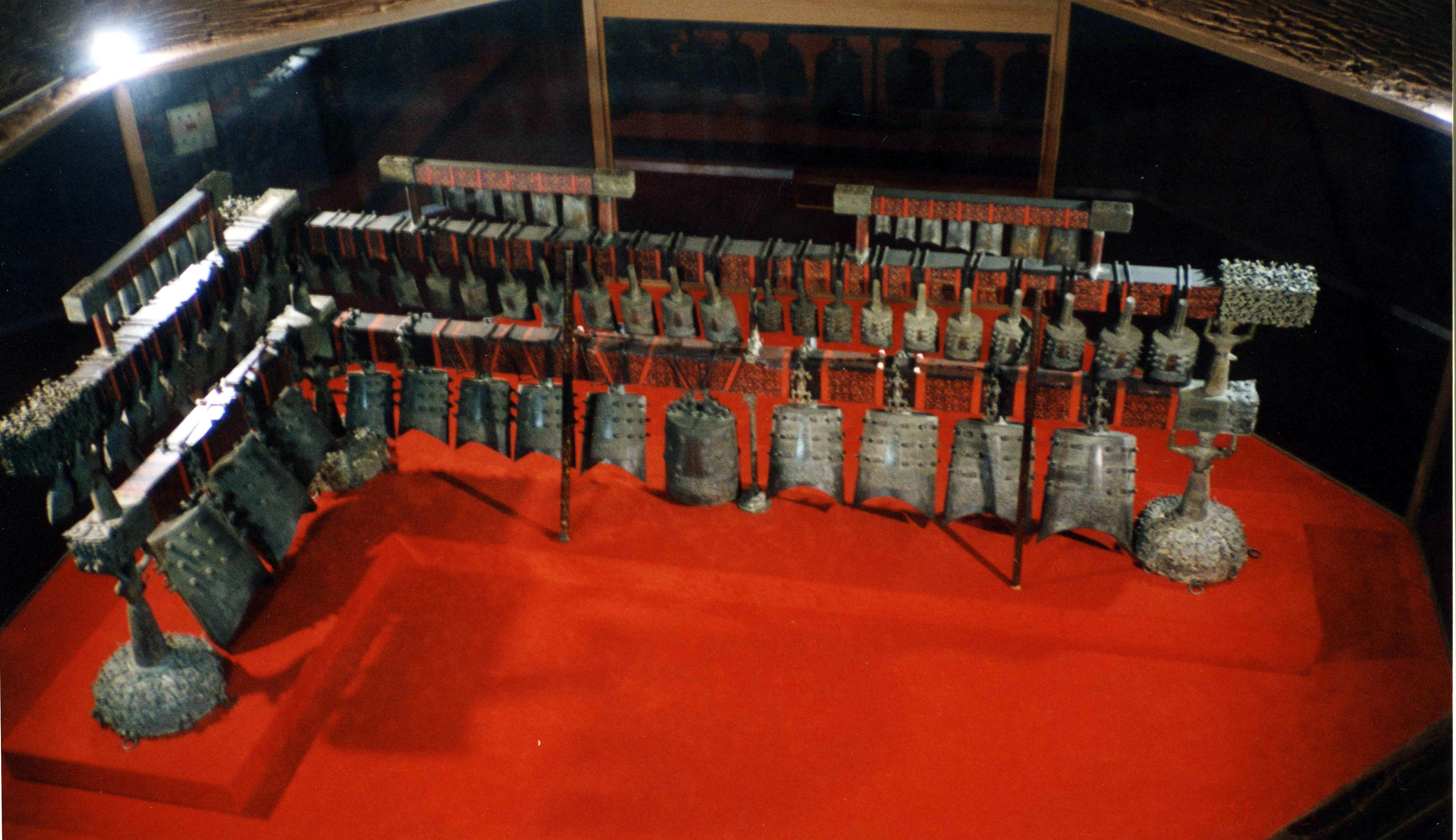
Chinese bells: Bianzhong of Marquis Yi of Zeng, Spring and Autumn period (476–221 BCE)

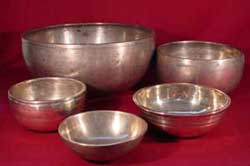
Singing bowls from the 16th to 18th centuries. Annealed bronze continues to be made in the Himalayas.

Bronze is the preferred metal for bells in the form of a high tin bronze alloy known as bell metal, which is typically about 23% tin.

Nearly all professional cymbals are made from bronze, which gives a desirable balance of durability and timbre. Several types of bronze are used, commonly B20 bronze, which is roughly 20% tin, 80% copper, with traces of silver, or the tougher B8 bronze made from 8% tin and 92% copper. As the tin content in a bell or cymbal rises, the timbre drops.

Bronze is also used for the windings of steel and nylon strings of various stringed instruments such as the double bass, piano, harpsichord, and guitar. Bronze strings are commonly reserved on pianoforte for the lower pitch tones, as they possess a superior sustain quality to that of high-tensile steel.

Bronzes of various metallurgical properties are widely used in struck idiophones around the world, notably bells, singing bowls, gongs, cymbals, and other idiophones from Asia. Examples include Tibetan singing bowls, temple bells of many sizes and shapes, Javanese gamelan, and other bronze musical instruments. The earliest bronze archeological finds in Indonesia date from 1–2 BCE, including flat plates probably suspended and struck by a wooden or bone mallet. Ancient bronze drums from Thailand and Vietnam date back 2,000 years. Bronze bells from Thailand and Cambodia date back to 3600 BCE.

Some companies are now making saxophones from phosphor bronze (3.5 to 10% tin and up to 1% phosphorus content). Bell bronze/B20 is used to make the tone rings of many professional model banjos. The tone ring is a heavy (usually 3 lb; 1.4 kg) folded or arched metal ring attached to a thick wood rim, over which a skin, or most often, a plastic membrane (or head) is stretched – it is the bell bronze that gives the banjo a crisp powerful lower register and clear bell-like treble register.

=== Sculptures ===
Bronze is widely used for casting bronze sculptures. Common bronze alloys have the unusual and desirable property of expanding slightly just before they set, thus filling the finest details of a mould. Then, as the bronze cools, it shrinks a bit, making it easier to separate from the mould. The Assyrian king Sennacherib (704–681 BCE) claims to have been the first to cast monumental bronze statues (of up to 30 tonnes) using two-part moulds instead of the lost-wax method.

Bronze statues were regarded as the highest form of sculpture in Ancient Greek art, though survivals are few, as bronze objects were frequently melted down for reuse throughout the Classical period. Many of the most famous Greek bronze sculptures are known through Roman copies in marble, which were more likely to survive.

In India, bronze sculptures from the Kushana (Chausa hoard) and Gupta periods (Brahma from Mirpur-Khas, Akota Hoard, Sultanganj Buddha) and later periods (Hansi Hoard) have been found. Indian Hindu artisans from the period of the Chola empire in Tamil Nadu used bronze to create intricate statues via the lost-wax casting method with ornate detailing depicting the deities of Hinduism. The art form survives to this day, with many silpis, craftsmen, working in the areas of Swamimalai and Chennai.

In antiquity other cultures also produced works of high art using bronze. For example, in Europe, Grecian bronzes typically of figures from Greek mythology; in east Asia, Chinese ritual bronzes of the Shang and Zhou dynasty—more often ceremonial vessels but including some figurine examples. Bronze continues into modern times as one of the materials of choice for monumental statuary.

The medieval and early-modern Castings of the Benin Empire (13–19th century CE), that are often labelled Bronzes, are technically cast, from an often leaded, Brass alloy.

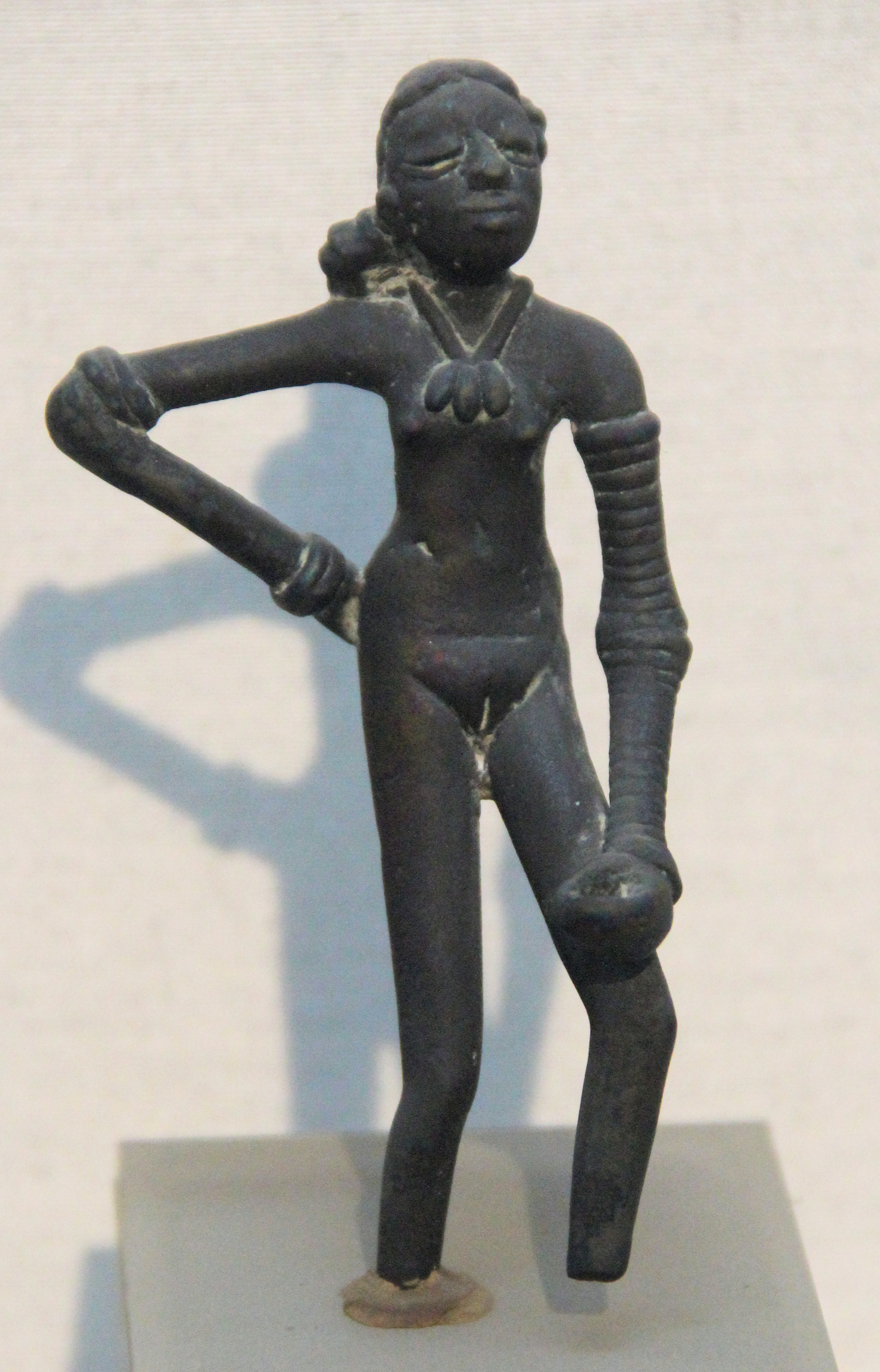
The Dancing Girl, an Harappan artwork; 2400–1900 BCE; bronze; height: 10.8 cm; National Museum (New Delhi, India)

Trundholm sun chariot; Nordic Bronze Age, c. 14th century BCE; National Museum of Denmark, Copenhagen

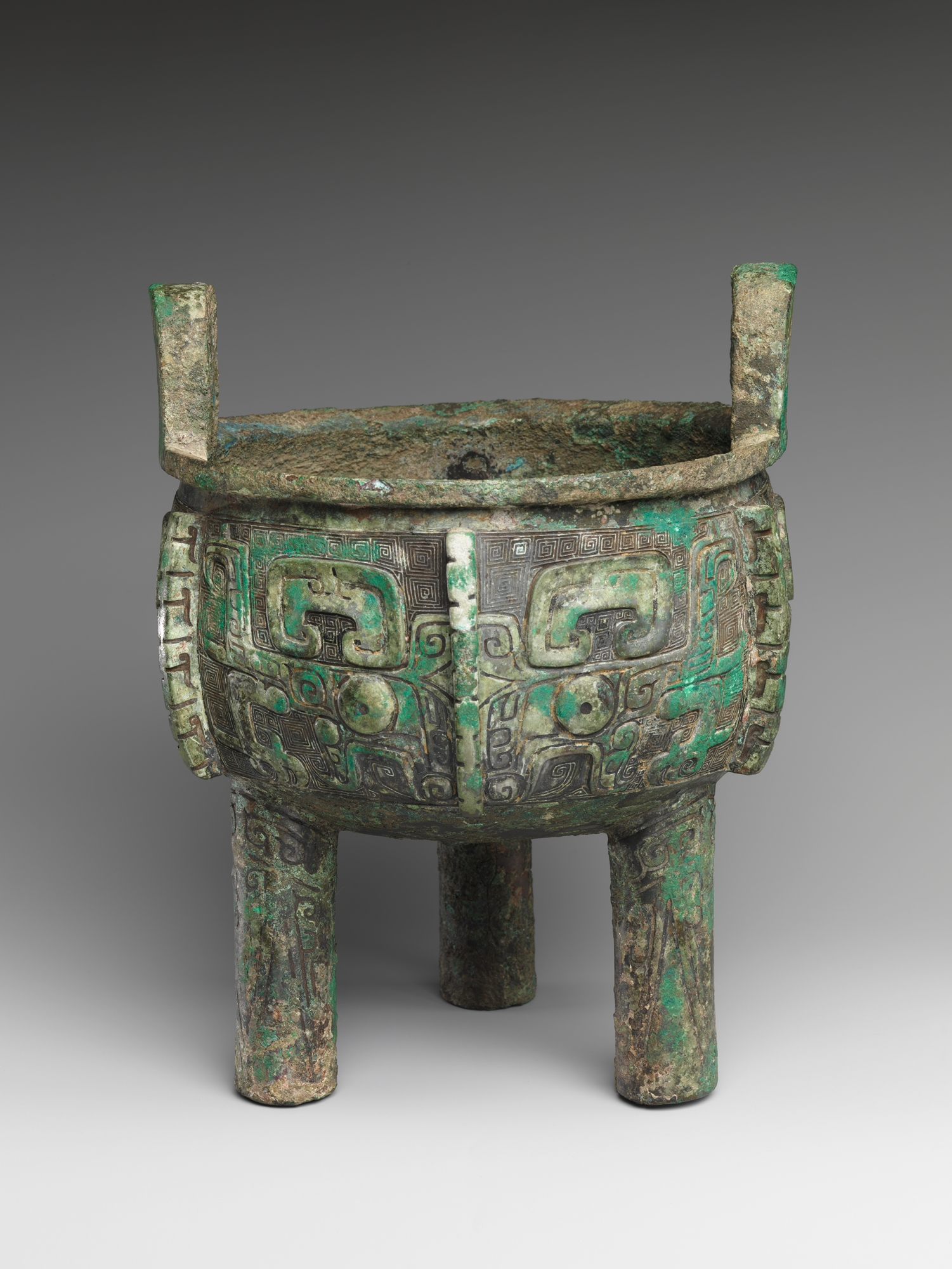
Chinese ritual bronze tripod cauldron (ding); c. 13th century BCE; bronze: height with handles: 25.4 cm; Metropolitan Museum of Art (New York City)

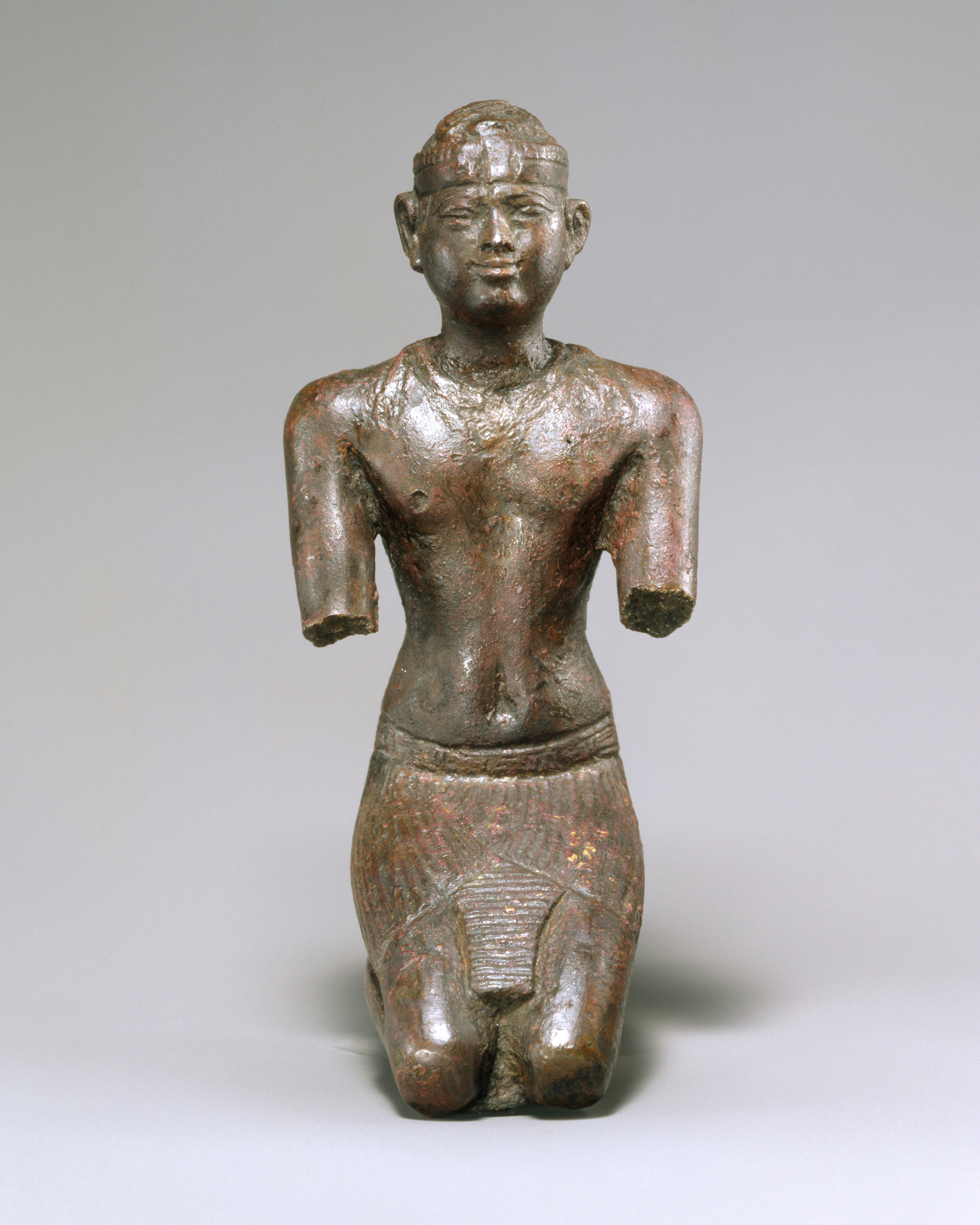
Ancient Egyptian statuette of a Kushite pharaoh; 713–664 BCE; bronze, precious-metal leaf; height: 7.6 cm, width: 3.2 cm, depth: 3.6 cm; Metropolitan Museum of Art

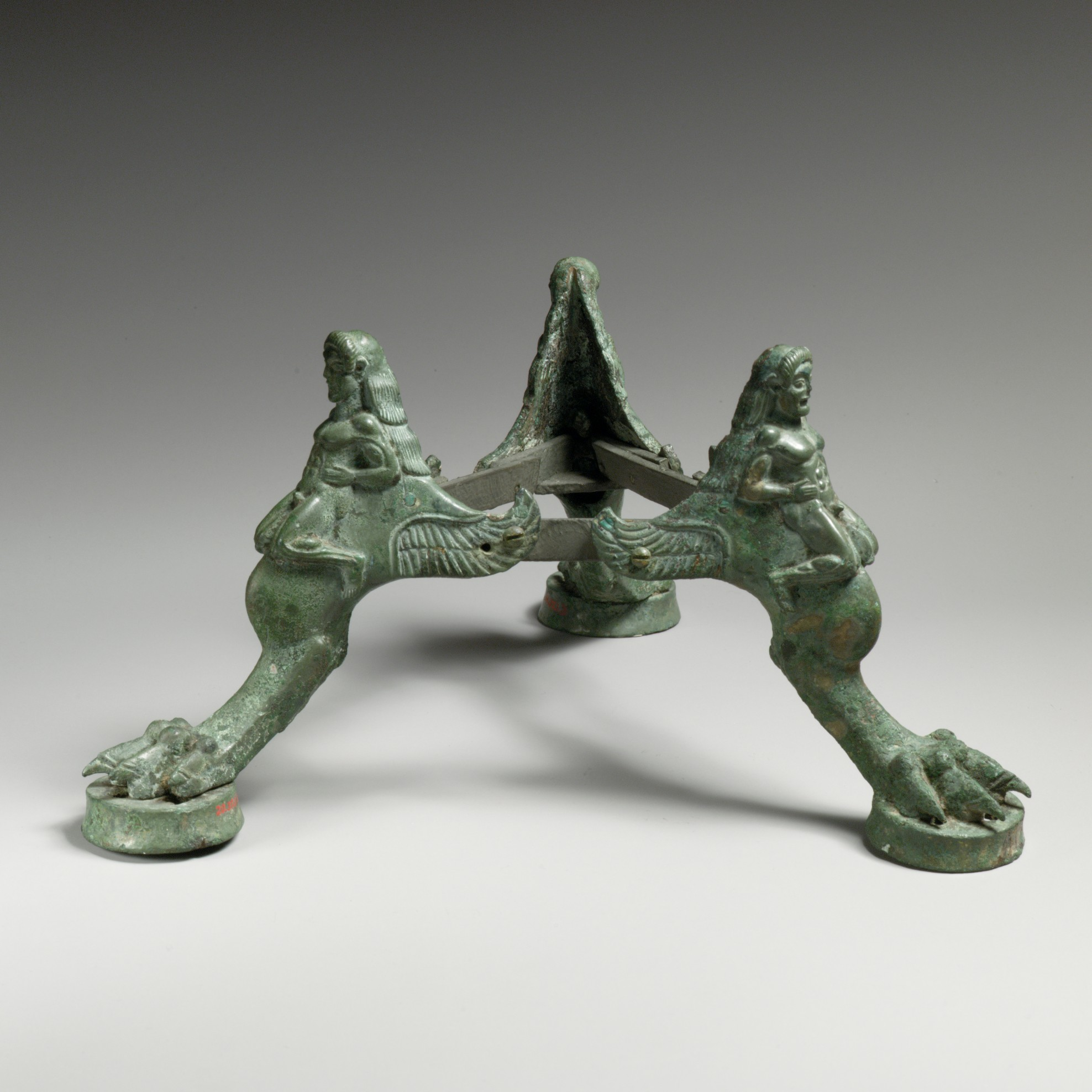
Etruscan tripod base for a thymiaterion (incense burner); 475–450 BCE; bronze; height: 11 cm; Metropolitan Museum of Art

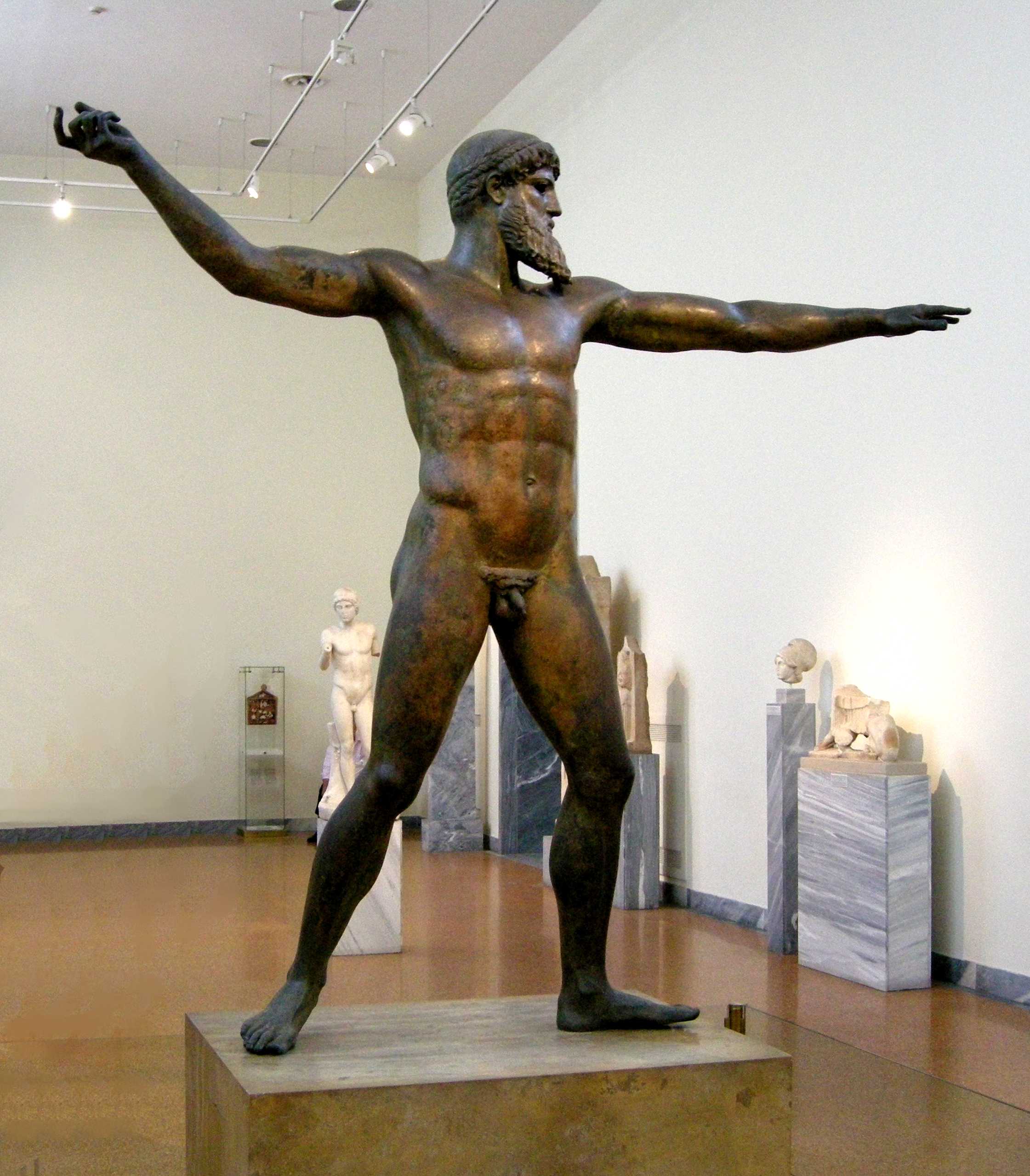
The Artemision Bronze; 460–450 BCE; bronze; height: 2.1 m; National Archaeological Museum (Athens)

Ancient Egyptian statuette of Isis and Horus; 305–30 BCE; solid cast of bronze; 4.8 × 10.3 cm; Cleveland Museum of Art (Cleveland, Ohio, US)

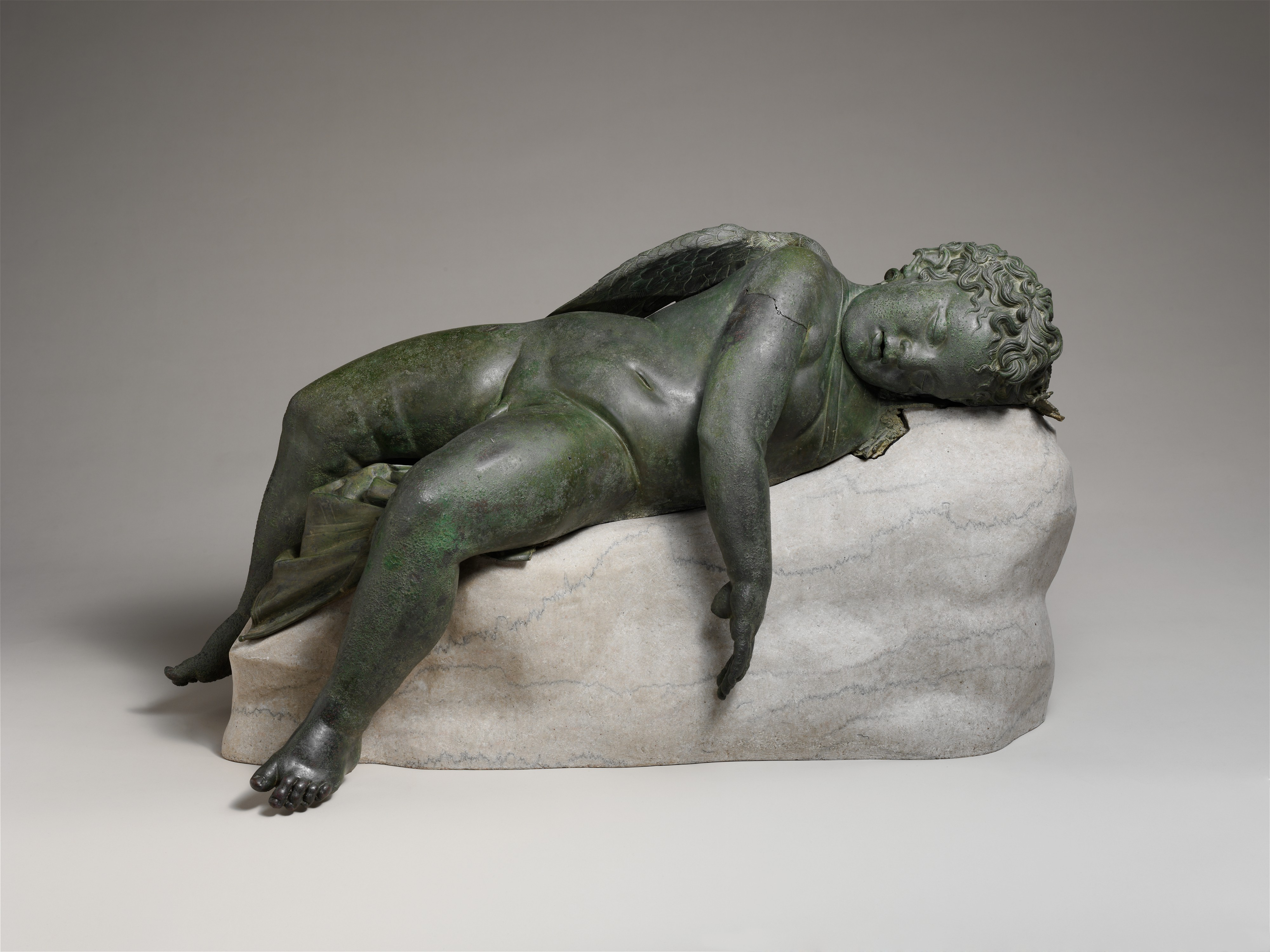
Ancient Greek statue of Eros sleeping; 3rd–2nd century BCE; bronze; 41.9 × 35.6 × 85.2 cm; Metropolitan Museum of Art

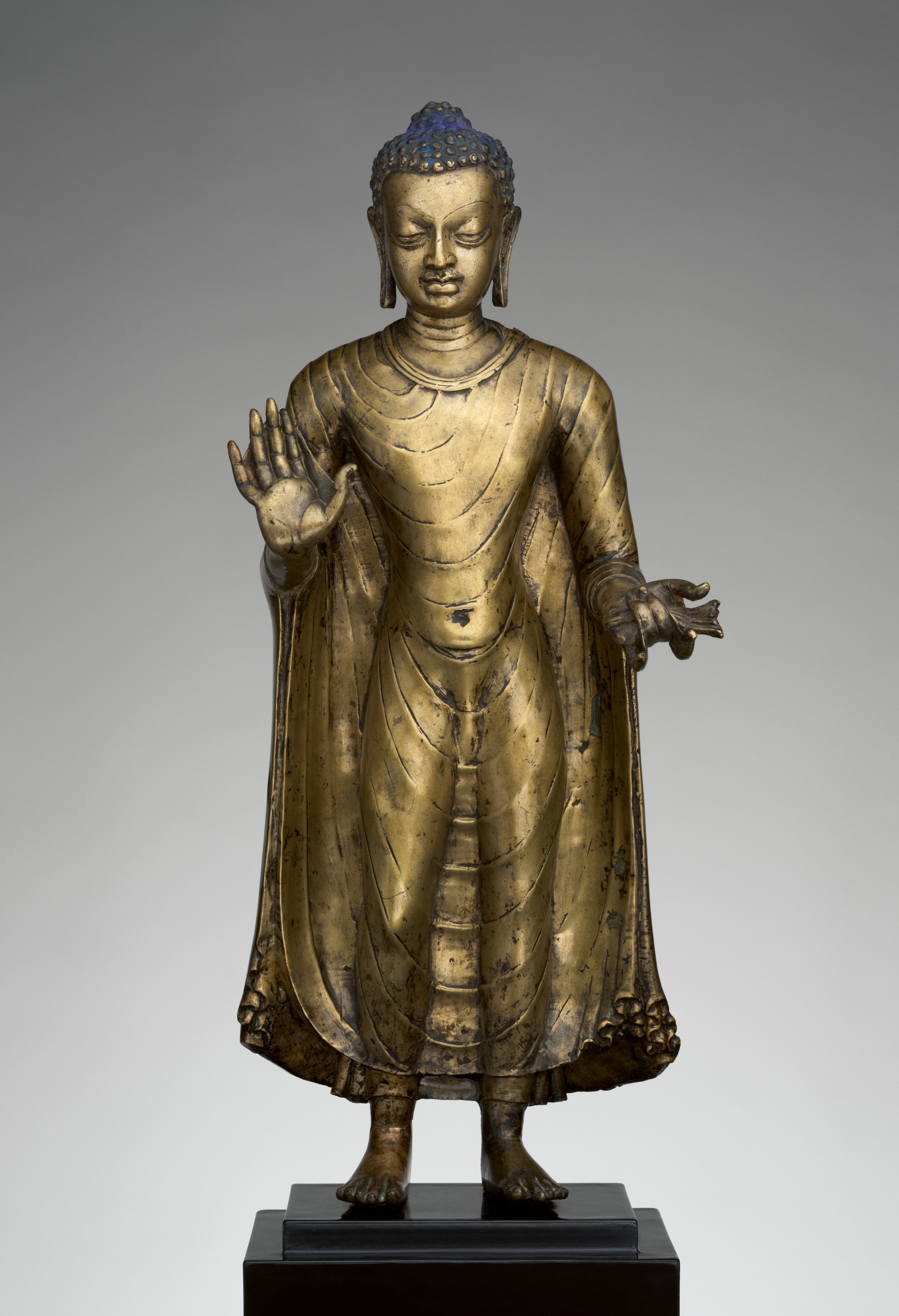
Buddha offering protection; late 6th–early 7th century; copper alloy; height: 47 cm, width: 15.6 cm, diameter: 14.3 cm; from India (probably Bihar / Later Gupta dynasty); Metropolitan Museum of Art

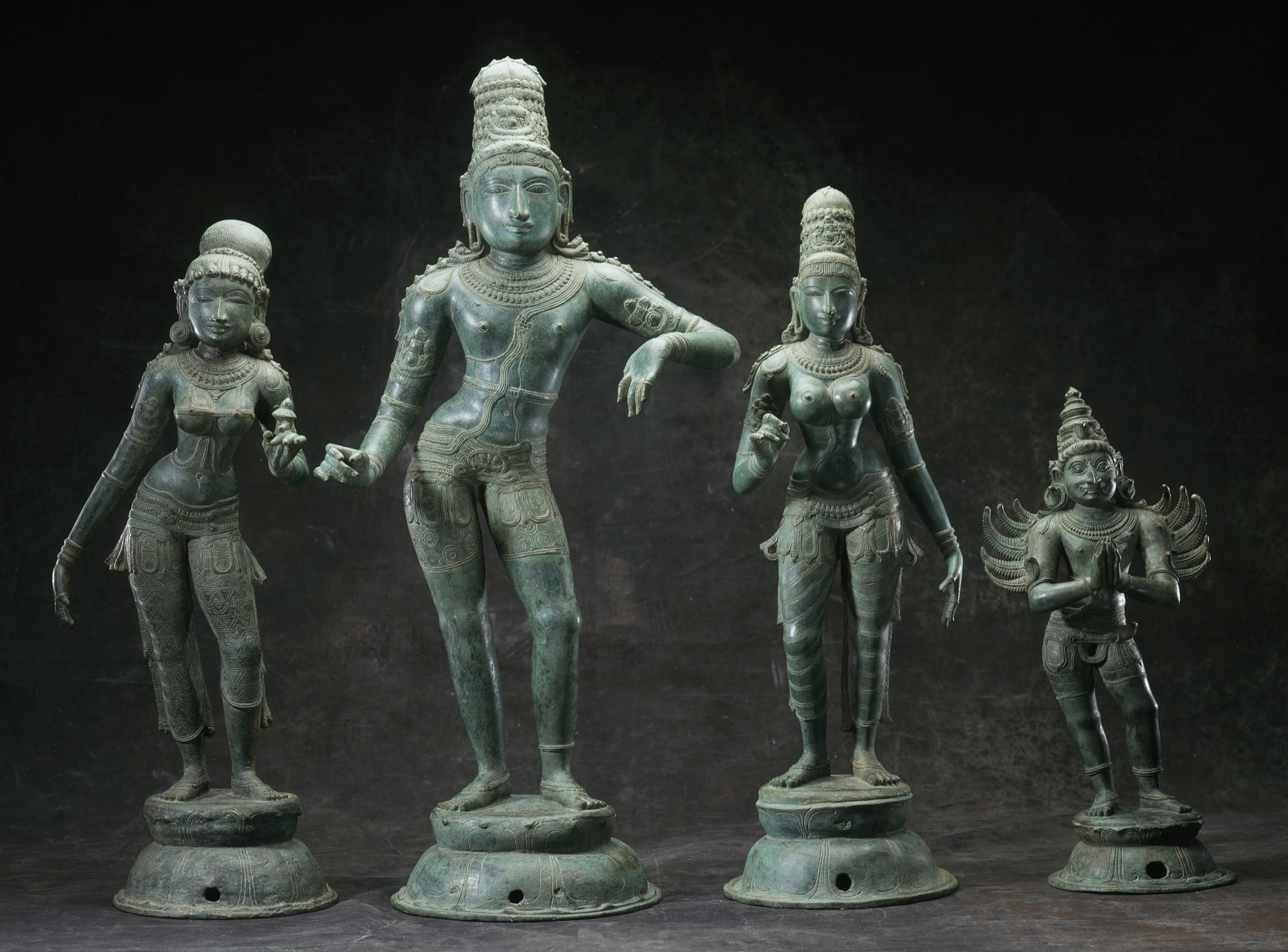
Krishna with his consorts Rukmini and Satyabhama and his mount Garuda, Tamil Nadu, India, late 11th–12th century

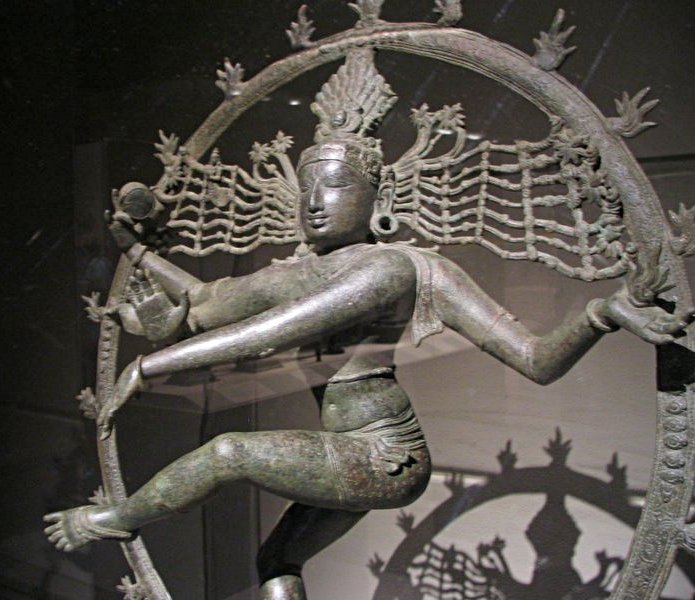
Bronze Chola Statue of Nataraja at the Metropolitan Museum of Art, New York City

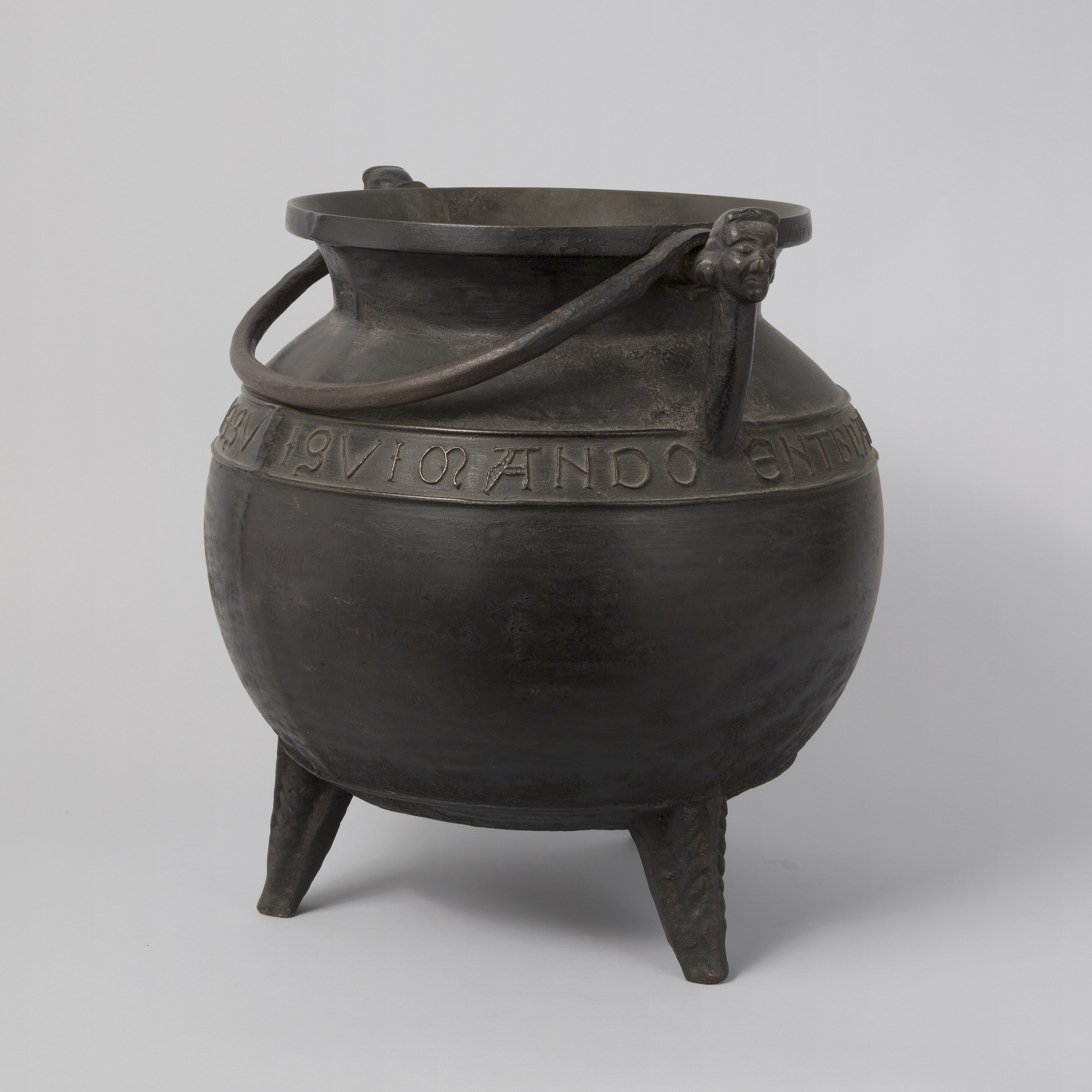
French or South Netherlandish Medieval caldron; 13th or 14th century; bronze and wrought iron; height: 37.5 cm, diameter: 34.3 cm; Metropolitan Museum of Art

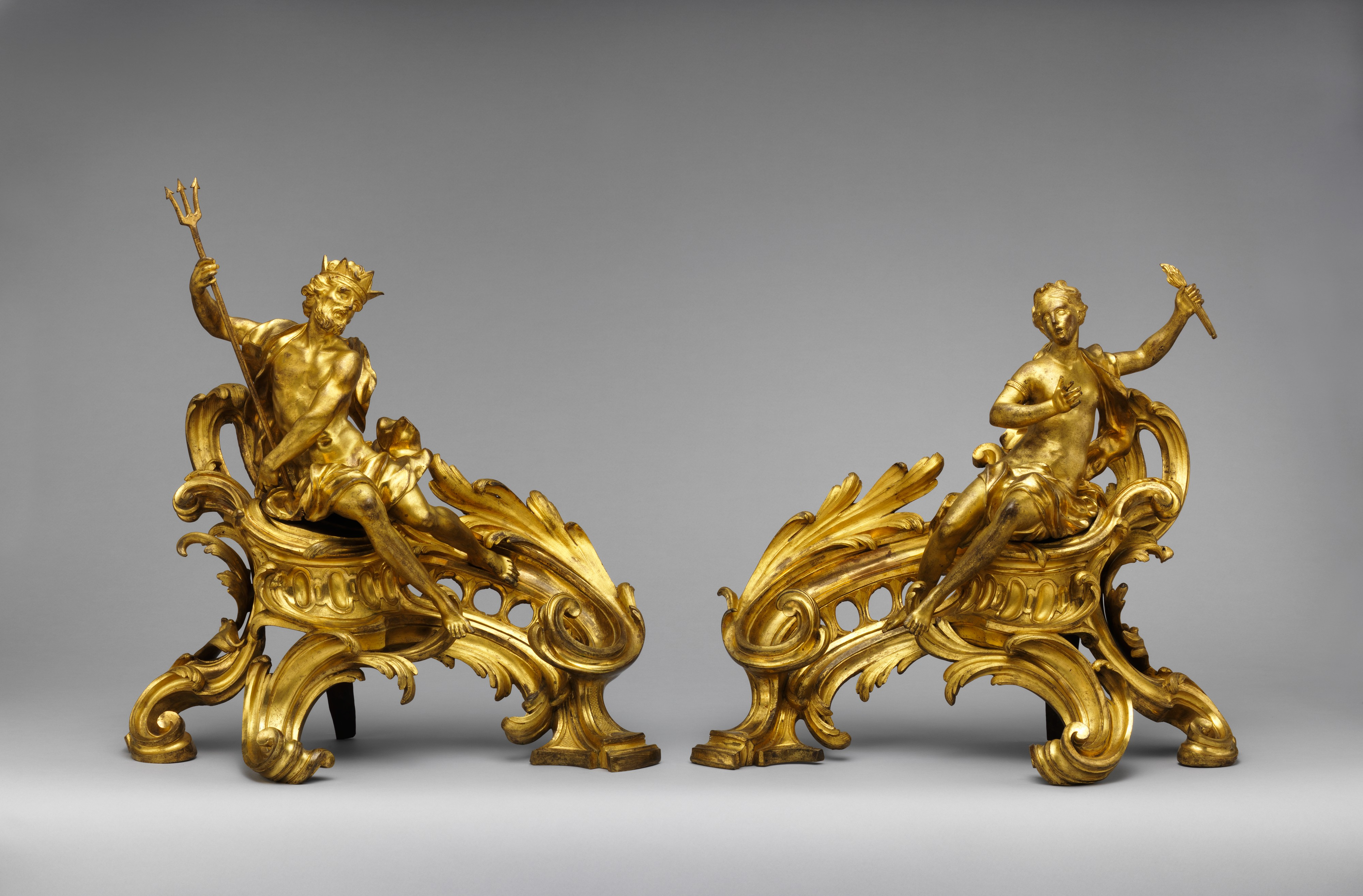
Pair of French Rococo firedogs (chenets); c. 1750; gilt bronze; dimensions of the first: 52.7 x 48.3 x 26.7 cm, of the second: 45.1 x 49.1 x 24.8 cm; Metropolitan Museum of Art

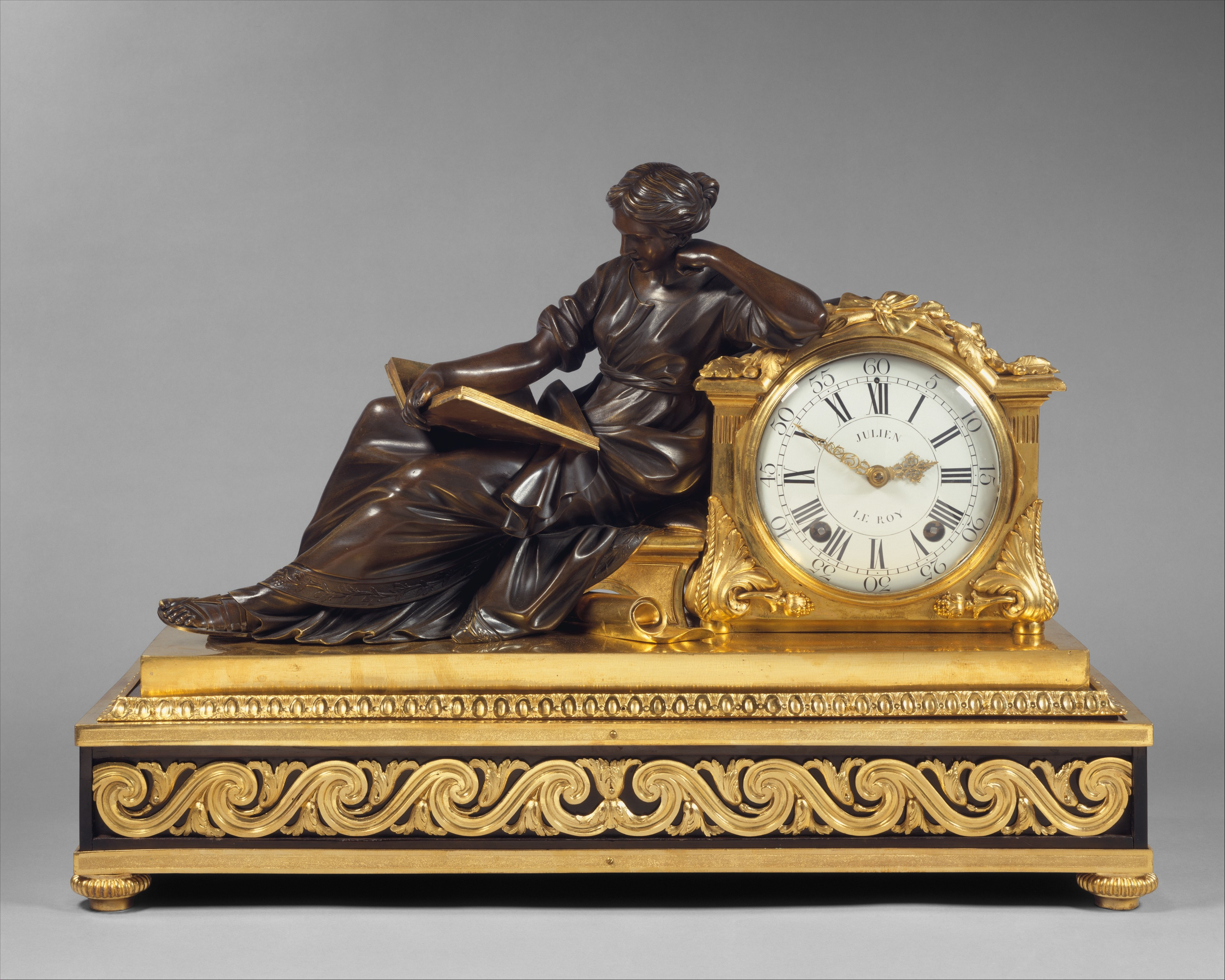
French Neoclassical mantel clock (pendule de cheminée); 1757–1760; gilded and patinated bronze, oak veneered with ebony, white enamel with black numerals, and other materials; 48.3 × 69.9 × 27.9 cm; Metropolitan Museum of Art

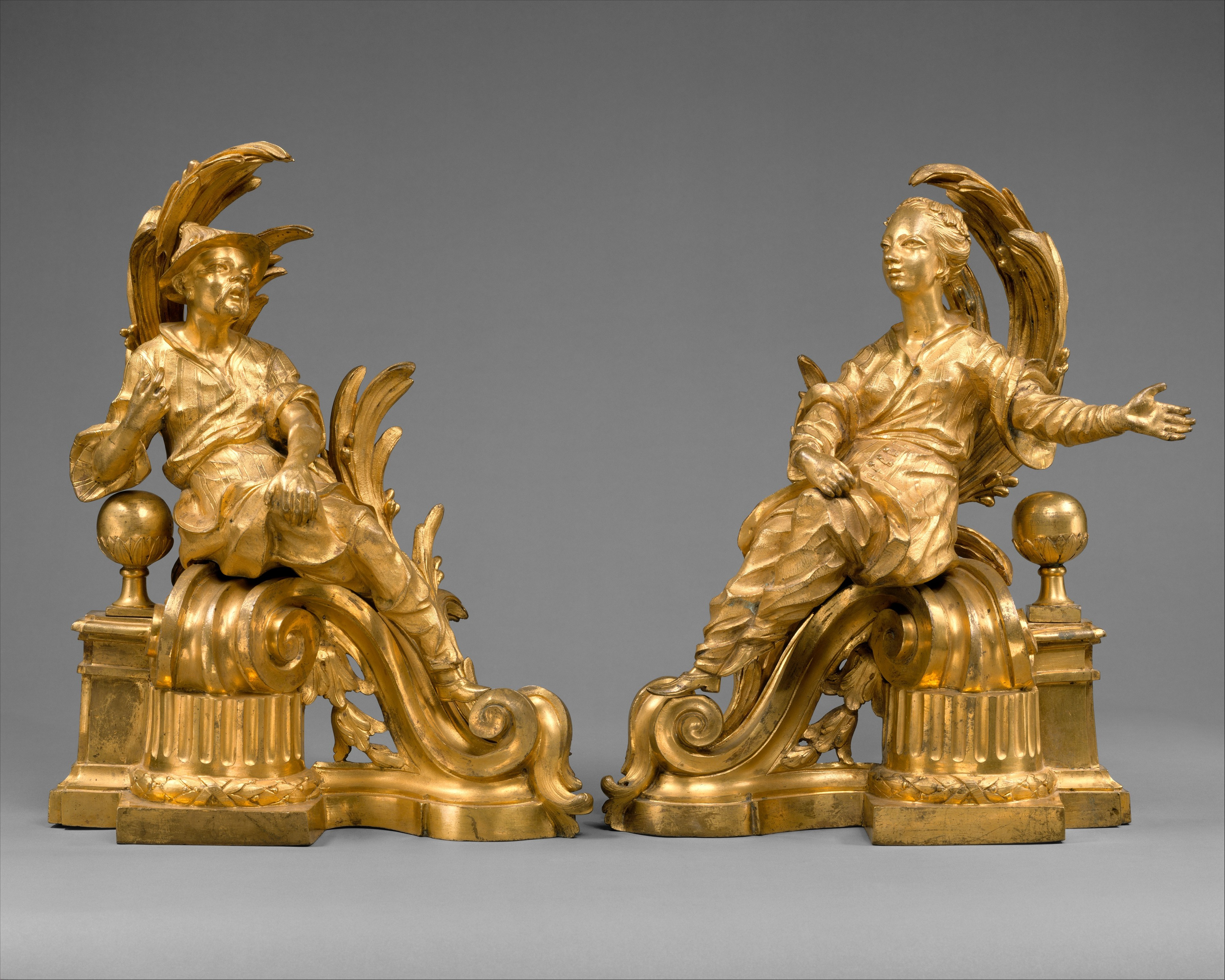
Pair of French Chinoiserie firedogs; 1760–1770; gilt bronze; height (each): 41.9 cm; Metropolitan Museum of Art

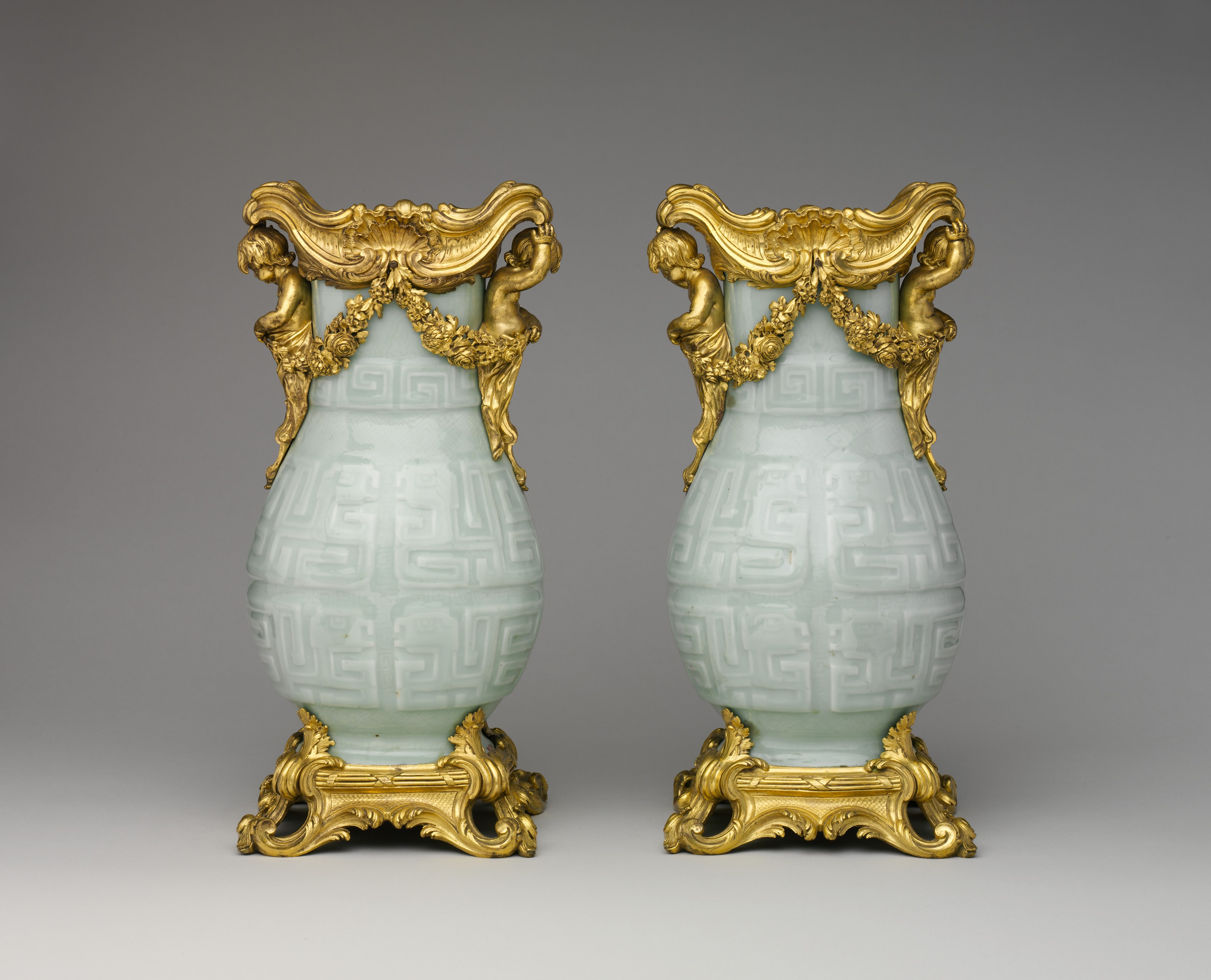
Pair of Chinese vases with French Rococo mounts; the vases: early 18th century, the mounts: 1760–70; hard-paste porcelain with gilt-bronze mounts; 32.4 x 16.5 x 12.4 cm; Metropolitan Museum of Art

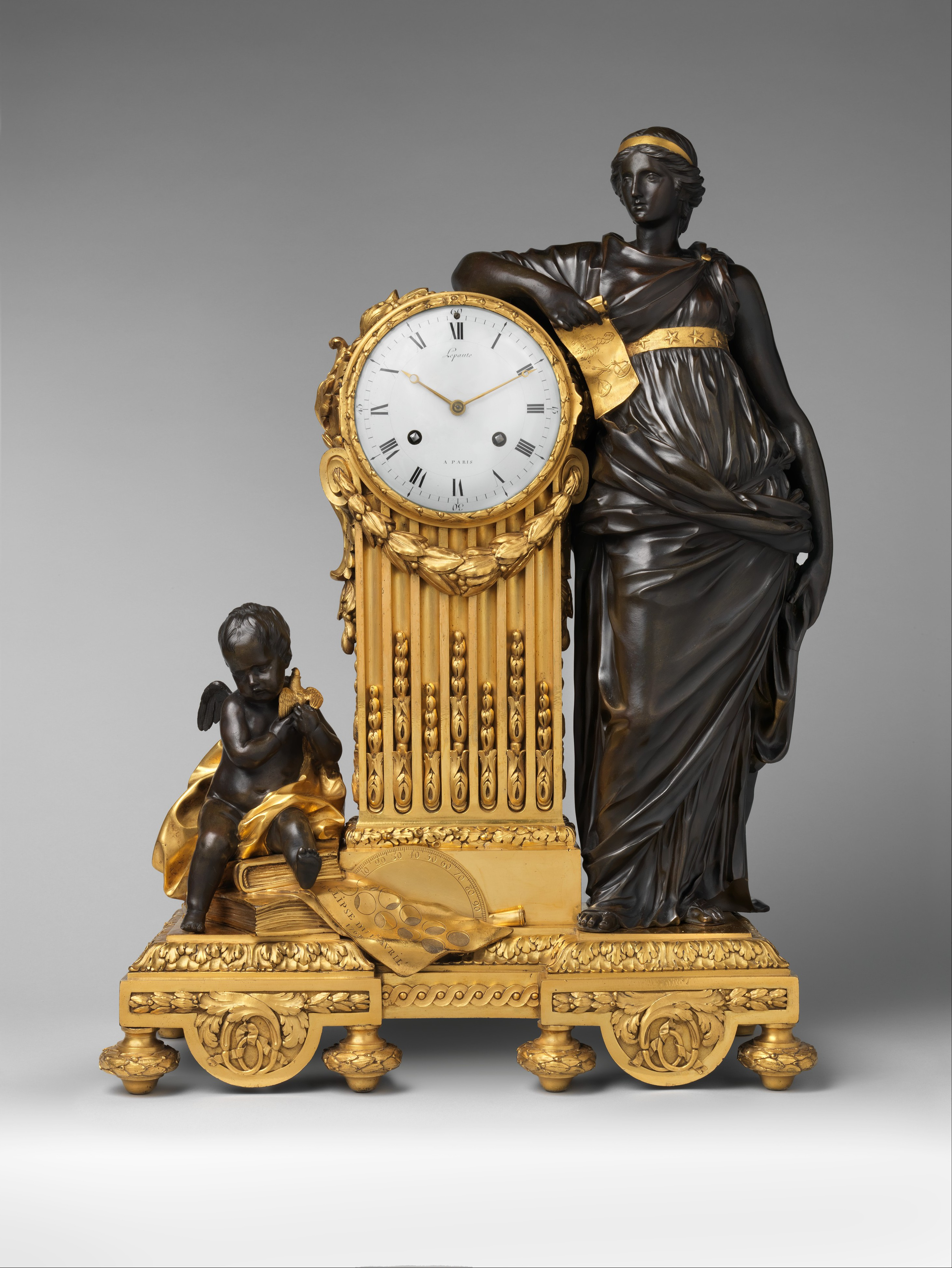
French Neoclassical mantel clock ("Pendule Uranie"); 1764–1770; case: patinated bronze and gilded bronze, Dial: white enamel, movement: brass and steel; 71.1 × 52.1 × 26.7 cm; Metropolitan Museum of Art

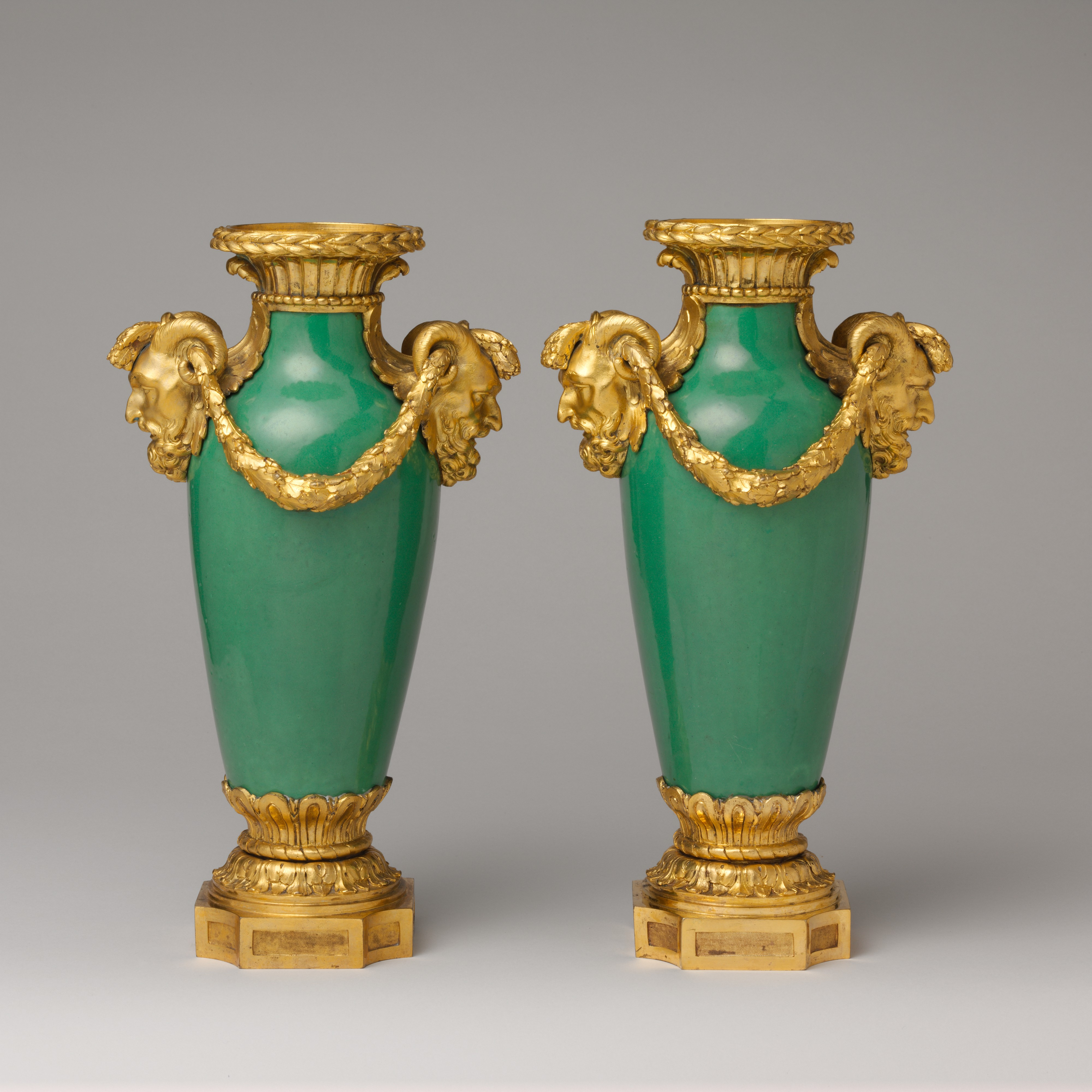
Pair of mounted vases (vase à monter); 1765–70; soft-paste porcelain and French gilt bronze; 28.9 x 17.1 cm; Metropolitan Museum of Art

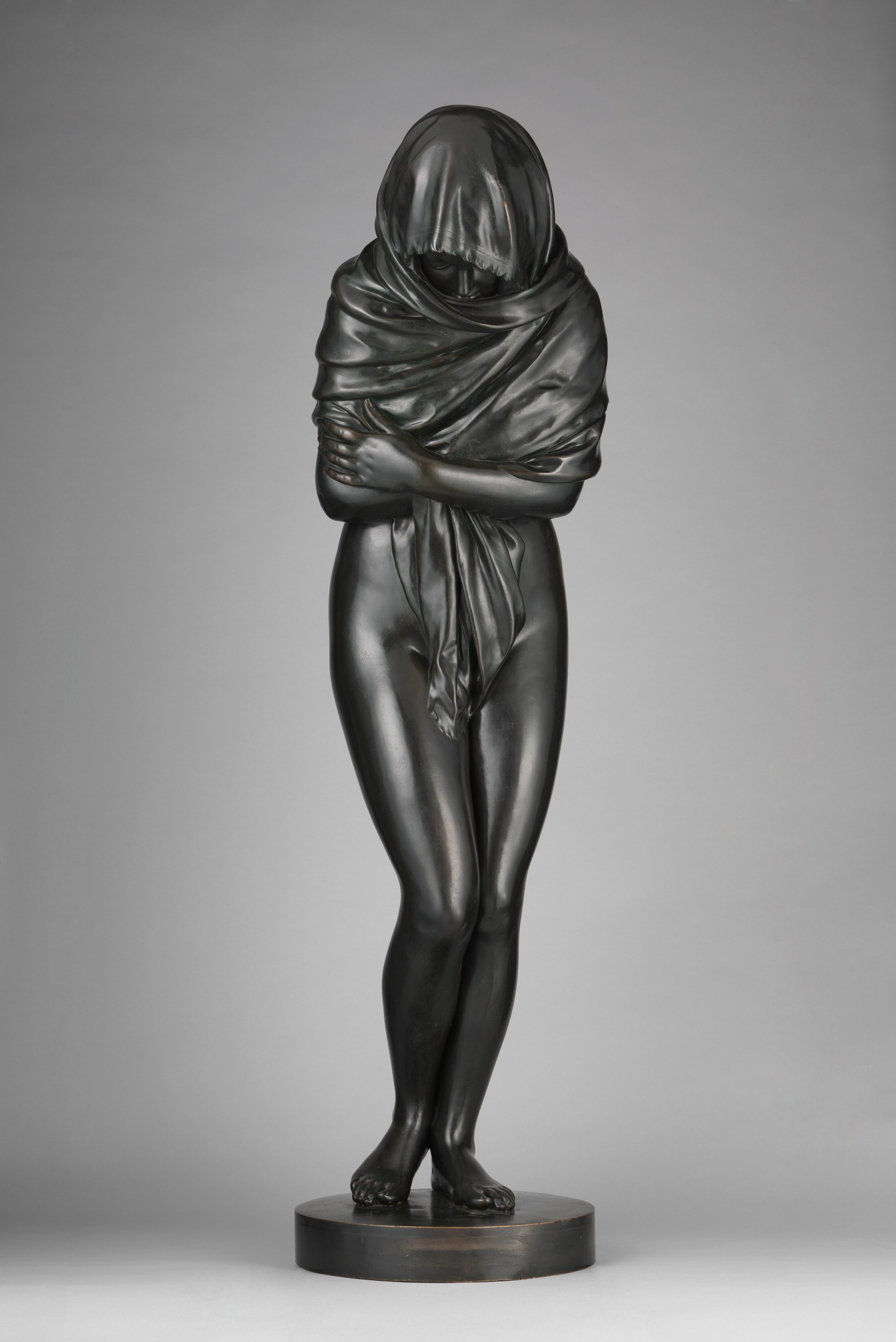
Winter; by Jean-Antoine Houdon; 1787; bronze; 143.5 x 39.1 x 50.5 cm, height of the pedestal: 86.4 cm; Metropolitan Museum of Art

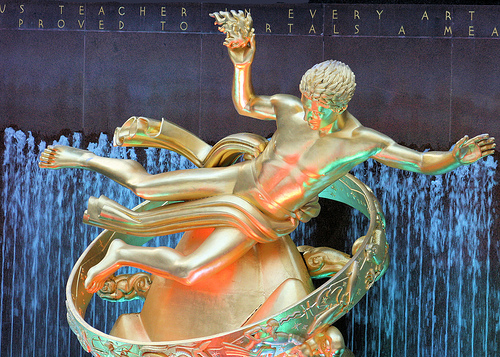
Prometheus, Paul Manship's classic gilded bronze sculpture, 1934, Rockefeller Center, New York City

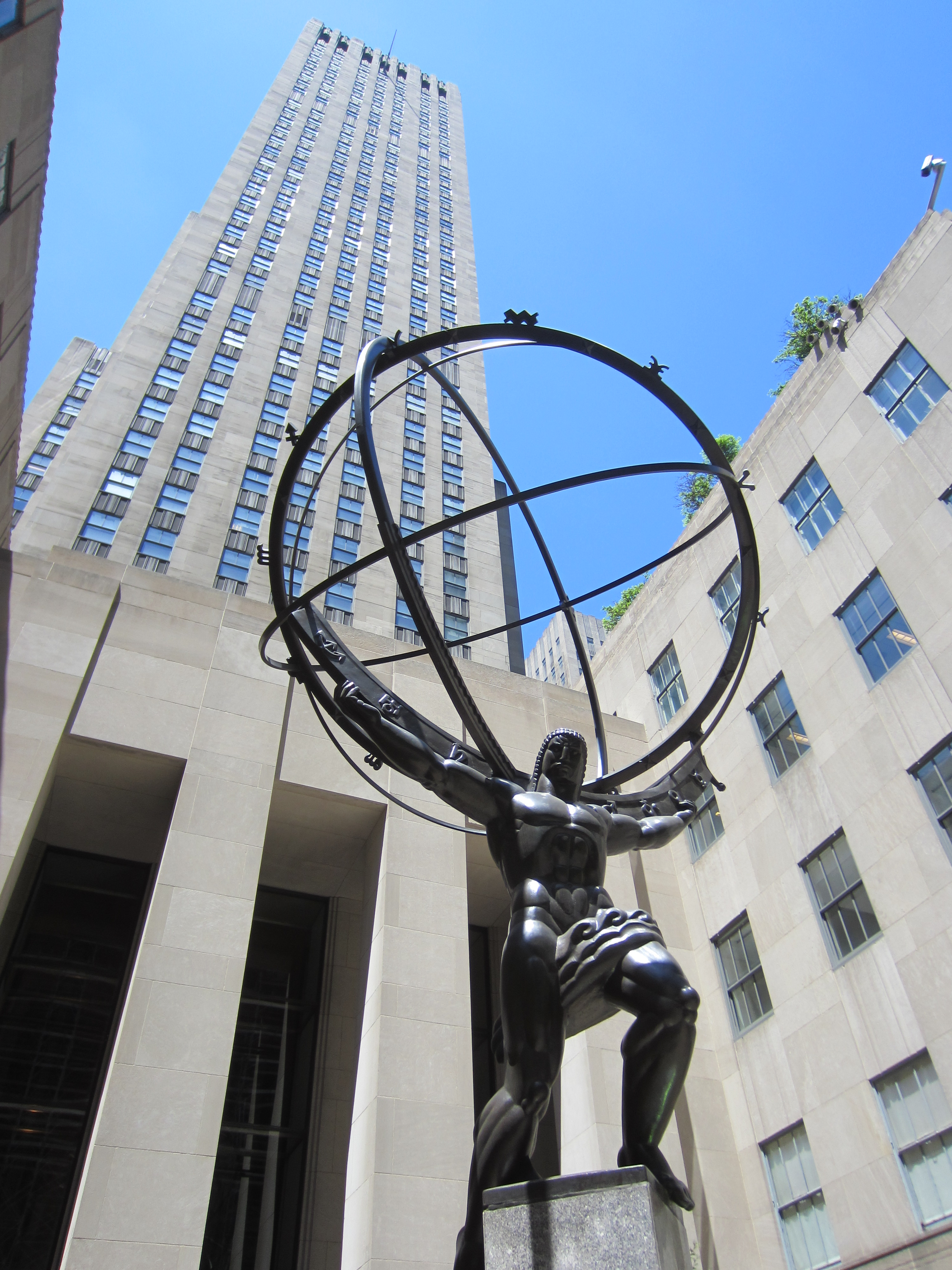
Atlas by Lee Lawrie, bronze sculpture, 1937, Rockefeller Center, New York City

== See also ==
- Art object
- Bell founding
- Bronze and brass ornamental work
- Bronzing
- Chinese bronze inscriptions
- Dezincification resistant brass
- French Empire mantel clock
- General Bronze Corporation
- List of copper alloys
- Ormolu
- Seagram Building, the first office building in the world to use extruded bronze on a facade
- Speiss
- Tiffany lamp
- UNS C69100 (Tungum), a bronze alloy of copper, aluminium, nickel, tin, and zinc
- Yoruba art
