= Tin poisoning =

- Tin
- Specialty: Toxicology

Tin poisoning refers to the toxic effects of tin and its compounds. Cases of poisoning from tin metal, its oxides, and its salts are "almost unknown"; on the other hand, certain organotin compounds are almost as toxic as cyanide.

== Biology and toxicology ==
Tin has no known natural biological role in living organisms. It is not easily absorbed by animals including humans. The low toxicity is relevant to the widespread use of tin in dinnerware and canned food. Nausea, vomiting and diarrhea have been reported after ingesting canned food containing 200 mg/kg of tin. This observation led, for example, the Food Standards Agency in the UK to propose upper limits of 200 mg/kg. A study showed that 99.5% of the controlled food cans contain tin in an amount below that level. However, un-lacquered tin cans with food of a low pH, such as fruits and pickled vegetables, can contain elevated concentrations of tin.

The toxic effects of tin compounds are based on its interference with iron and copper metabolism. For example, it affects heme and cytochrome P450, and decreases their effectiveness.

Organotin compounds can be very toxic. "Tri-n-alkyltins" are phytotoxic and, depending on the organic groups, can be powerful bactericides and fungicides. Other triorganotins are used as miticides and acaricides. Tributyltin (TBT) was extensively used in marine antifouling paints, until discontinued for leisure craft due to concerns over longer-term marine toxicity in high-traffic areas such as marinas with large numbers of static boats.
