= Rasmussen aneurysm =

Medical condition

Rasmussen aneurysm is a distinctive variant of pseudoaneurysm of a branch of the pulmonary artery, predominantly found adjacent to or within a lung cavity, both often arising as a complication of pulmonary tuberculosis. The condition was originally described by Fritz Valdemar Rasmussen in 1868. It is a relatively uncommon complication associated with cavitary tuberculosis of the lung, with its prevalence observed in approximately 5–8% of cases based on autopsy findings.

It is caused by the progressive thinning of the pulmonary artery wall. This weakening process is characterized by the replacement of both the tunica externa and tunica media with granulation tissue, which subsequently undergoes transformation into fibrin. This tissue remodeling is a consequence of the healing response in the associated lung cavity. The dilation of the pulmonary artery in close proximity to or involvement within the lung cavity leads to the formation of a pseudoaneurysm. As is typical with any aneurysm, Rasmussen aneurysm carries the inherent risk of rupture, which may result in life-threatening massive hemoptysis, characterized by the coughing of blood. Such events are associated with a mortality rate exceeding 50%.

Historically, Rasmussen aneurysms were widely regarded as a common etiology of hemoptysis, particularly in tuberculosis cases. However, with advancements in antibiotic therapy and improvements in medical knowledge, contemporary understanding has evolved. Current medical insight suggests that the majority of hemoptysis cases are more closely linked to bleeding originating from the systemic bronchial arteries within the lung, with pulmonary artery aneurysms accounting for less than 10% of cases. This shift has led to a significant alteration in the approach taken by medical professionals in the diagnosis and management of hemoptysis within clinical practice.

Rasmussen aneurysm was initially associated exclusively with cavitary tuberculosis, but the term is now utilized to encompass any anatomical aneurysm occurring in conjunction with various forms of destructive lung lesions.
