= Pulmonary artery agenesis =

Rare congenital absence of a pulmonary artery

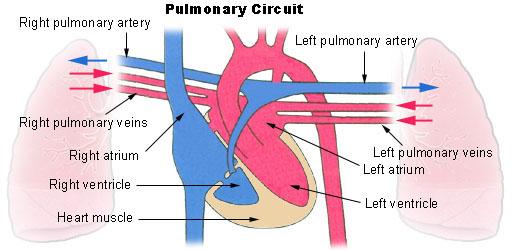
The main pulmonary trunk divides into the left and the right pulmonary artery. Pulmonary artery agenesis refers to the absence of one or both pulmonary arteries.

Pulmonary artery agenesis refers to a rare congenital absence of pulmonary artery due to a malformation in the sixth aortic arch. It can occur bilaterally, with both left and right pulmonary arteries being absent, or unilaterally, the absence of either left or right pulmonary artery (UAPA). About 67% of UAPA occurs isolated in the right lung. The absence of pulmonary artery can be an isolated disorder, or accompanied by other related lesions, most commonly Tetralogy of Fallot.

Back in 1868, Fraentzel was the first to report isolated unilateral absence of pulmonary artery (IUAPA) in literature. Subsequently, literature has documented a total of 420 cases. The estimated prevalence of IUAPA is 1 in 200,000 adults. No sex preference is observed. Patients with severe complications are usually diagnosed early in age while adult patients are mainly asymptomatic. The overall mortality rate reaches 7%.

Individuals may exhibit a variety of symptoms, or they may not exhibit any symptoms at all. Recurrent lung infections and exercise intolerance are some of the most common symptoms. Serious complications include hemoptysis and pulmonary hypertension. These non-specific symptoms make UAPA challenging to diagnose. Multiple medical imaging techniques are often employed in combination in order to obtain a comprehensive diagnosis.

== Cause ==
Pulmonary artery agenesis refers to the absence or maldevelopment of one or both pulmonary arteries in foetal development. This rare congenital condition arises from abnormal maturation of the sixth aortic arch during embryogenesis. In embryonic growth, the primordial truncus arteriosus is divided into aorta and pulmonary trunk by septation. Any disruptions in septation may cause the failure of the development of the branch pulmonary artery from the sixth aortic arch. The exact pathogenesis is not fully understood.

== Mortality rate and cause of death ==
The overall mortality rate of UAPA in all patients is about 7%. Newborns with respiratory distress and severe pulmonary hypertension have poor outcomes. 30% of patients remain asymptomatic throughout adult life. Delayed diagnosis and follow-up medical interventions may lead to lung hypoplasia.

Pulmonary haemorrhage, recurrent infections and pulmonary hypertension may hinder the possibility of long-term survival. Survival is probable until patients reach their sixties. Common causes of death include right heart failure, respiratory failure, massive pulmonary hemorrhage and high-altitude pulmonary edema.

== Signs and symptoms ==
40% of UAPA patients exhibit symptoms of exercise intolerance or dyspnea during exertion. Other common symptoms include hemoptysis in 20% of patients, chest pain, pleural effusion or recurrent pulmonary infections. UAPA may rarely cause the development of severe, life-threatening hemoptysis. Pulmonary hypertension is another potentially fatal condition that affects 20% of patients. IUAPA patients with no associated cardiac anomalies might remain largely asymptomatic into adulthood. It has been noted that individuals who have a unilateral absence of the right pulmonary artery in particular are more vulnerable to high-altitude pulmonary edema.

=== Hemoptysis ===
In IUAPA patients, collateral arteries and shunts are developed in the affected lung from the systemic network. The collateral network supplies the pulmonary blood from the heart to the affected lung in place of the absent pulmonary artery. Hemoptysis occurs when the thin walls of the extensive systemic collateral network rupture. The occurrence of hemoptysis may resolve on its own and persist without intervention for many years. However, it might also lead to severe pulmonary haemorrhage and fatal outcomes.

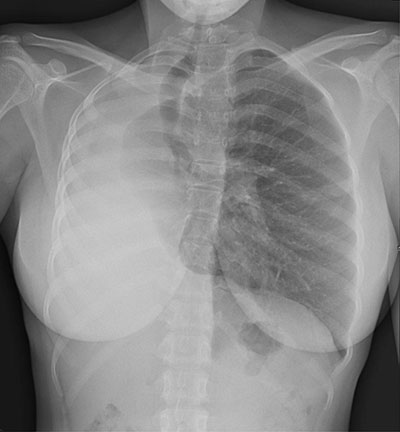
Chest X ray showing lung hypoplasia on the right side.

=== Lung hypoplasia on affected side ===
UAPA can cause hypoplasia in the affected lung due to the disruption of blood flow to the lung. The decreased blood flow can interrupt normal lung development, resulting in the lung being small and hypoplastic.

=== Pulmonary hypertension (PHT) ===
PHT can be caused by excess blood flow diverted to the remaining pulmonary artery from the absent pulmonary artery. Vasoconstrictive substances, like endothelin, are released as a result of shear pressure caused by increased blood flow in the unaffected pulmonary artery. Persistent constriction due to the substances can cause remodelling in the pulmonary arterioles, which raises the resistance of the pulmonary vasculature and causes PHT. Additional explanations for PHT include inadequate elasticity of the pulmonary vascular bed on the unaffected side to withstand the full cardiac output and abnormal response to vasoconstrictive substances.

== Diagnosis ==
The non-specific symptoms and the lack of awareness of such an uncommon condition make UAPA difficult to diagnose. Abnormalities found in imaging tests are more subtle and can be overlooked in infants. Patients with uncomplicated isolated UAPA typically have normal electrocardiograms. Making a diagnosis requires a complete medical history, physical assessment, and laboratory examination, coupled with a high index of suspicion. To obtain a comprehensive evaluation of the conditions, multiple imaging modalities are often used in conjunction.

=== Chest Radiography ===
Chest X-rays are often the initial imaging modality used to evaluate patients with symptoms of cardiovascular diseases. While they may not provide detailed visualization of the pulmonary arteries, certain findings that raise suspicion for UAPA could be incidentally detected. Patients with UAPA typically have asymmetric lung fields on their chest radiographs, with a hyperlucent lung held in an ipsilateral small hemithorax. The mediastinum and trachea are shifted to the affected side of the lung, and the hilar vasculature is absent or significantly reduced on that side. Ipsilateral diminished pulmonary vascular markings, ipsilateral elevated hemidiaphragm, hyperinflated contralateral lung and enlarged pulmonary artery may also be observed in chest X-rays.

=== Magnetic resonance imaging (MRI) and computed tomography (CT) ===
When a chest radiograph reveals suspicious findings, MRI and CT can be used to definitively diagnose UAPA. These techniques produce cross-sectional images of the chest and effectively visualize the absence of one of the pulmonary arteries, typically terminating within 1 cm of its expected origin from the main pulmonary artery. Other observations that suggest the possibility of UAPA from CT or MRI include mosaic parenchymal alterations, intact peripheral branches of the pulmonary artery, reduced pulmonary blood vessels, and ipsilateral collateral vasculature hypertrophy.

=== Transthoracic echocardiography ===
Transthoracic echocardiography serves as another complementary tool to confirm the diagnosis of UAPA. It has the advantage of being able to detect pulmonary hypertension and associated cardiac abnormalities at the same time.

=== Angiography ===
Pulmonary angiography is the gold standard for diagnosis of pulmonary artery agenesis. It is an invasive method that directly demonstrates the absence of one of the pulmonary arteries through the injection of a contrast dye into the blood. Magnetic resonance angiography (MRA) can be employed to assess the haemodynamic status in real-time. With current CT, MRI and MRA technologies, conventional pulmonary angiography is rarely carried out unless embolization is necessary for significant hemoptysis. Pulmonary venous wedge angiography is especially helpful in outlining the hypoplastic intrapulmonary vessels and the ipsilateral hilar pulmonary artery before revascularization surgery.

== Treatment ==
There is no specific treatment for this abnormality. Therapeutic plans are individualized based on patients’ severity, symptoms and complications.

For asymptomatic patients with no evidence of cardiopulmonary dysfunction, no treatment is required. Regular check-up, for example annual echocardiography assessment, is advised for prompt detection of pulmonary hypertension. For patients with massive hemoptysis, recurrent lower respiratory tract infection, pneumonia or pulmonary hypertension, treatment is necessary. Hemoptysis can be treated by pneumonectomy or embolization of systemic-to-pulmonary collateral arteries.

=== Revascularization ===
Surgical anastomosis attaches the intrapulmonary branches of the affected pulmonary artery to the hilum of the lung. After revascularization, systemic blood flow from the heart to the lung returns to normal. The removal of obstruction causes a partial reduction in collateral arteries. Pulmonary hypertension is improved post-surgery. In newborn, surgical instruments involve prosthetic materials, saphenous vein grafts and autologous pericardial tubes. Successful revascularization has been reported in young patients. Such procedure gives better outcomes in children. In adult patients, pulmonary artery reconstruction is not feasible as their intrapulmonary artery might be narrowed or completely obstructed. Lung biopsy is recommended prior to revascularization. Reconstruction surgery is not to be carried out if arteriovenous communication or abnormal vascular anatomy are observed.

=== Pneumonectomy ===
Pneumonectomy refers to the removal of the lung on the side of pulmonary artery agenesis. In the absence of a pulmonary artery, the lung on the affected side is not involved in ventilation. Instead, it leads to symptoms such as hemoptysis, pulmonary hypertension and congestive heart failure. Removal of the affected lung may treat related complications. Successful neonatal pneumonectomy has been reported in a 23-day-old baby. Outcome of the surgery is nonetheless indefinite. Excessive bleeding can occur during pneumonectomy, and hemoptysis may still be observed after surgery. After the removal of one lung, postpneumonectomy syndrome may be present. The mediastinum shifts to the affected side and compresses airways.

=== Embolization of collateral arteries ===
Embolization involves surgical blockage of selective collateral arteries developing from systemic circulation. Occlusion in the artery can be done using Gelfoam and Ivalon particles with coils. Specific coil sizes for the artery can be selected. Microcatheters enable higher selectivity during catheterization and embolization. Possible side effects include postembolization syndrome and lung infarction. The surgical procedure is safer, less invasive and has minimal side effects. It can be an alternative treatment to lung resection. However, embolization may face a lack of professionals and technical issues in placing coils in arteries. The chronic recurrence rate is as high as 25% owing to the extensive collateral network.

Pulmonary hypertension can be alleviated by long-term medication of vasodilators. They can improve survival when surgical procedures are not favourable or when pulmonary hypertension is still present after surgery.

The chemical structure of bosentan.

=== Pharmacotherapy ===
Orally administered drugs for reducing pulmonary hypertension include endothelin receptor antagonists (e.g. bosentan) and calcium channel blockers. Parenteral injection of prostacyclins are also carried out continuously for such patients. Oral administration or intravenous injection of phosphodiesterase inhibitors serve as vasodilators.

=== Heart-lung transplantation ===
For severe conditions of pulmonary artery agenesis, transplantation of both heart and lung can significantly elevate the oxygen level in blood. Heart-lung transplantation may be suggested for patients with recurrent hemoptysis, pulmonary hypertension and exercise intolerance.
