= Hughes–Stovin syndrome =

Autoimmune disorder

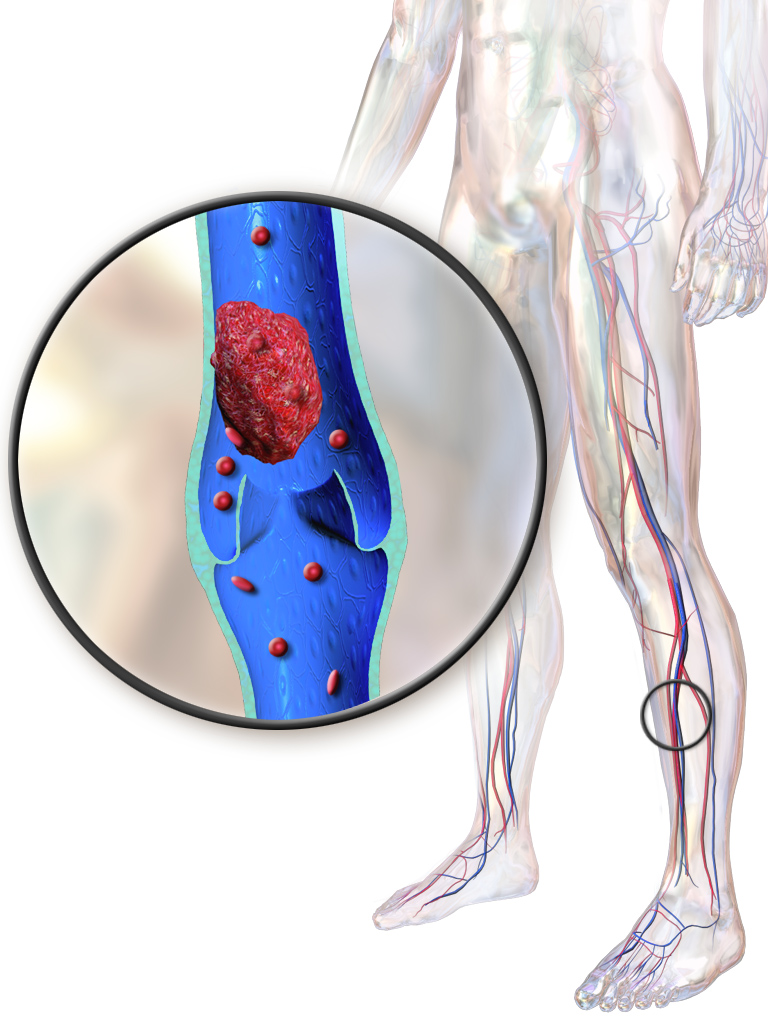
- Deep vein thrombosis; one of the prevalent symptoms of the syndrome
- Specialty: Immunology

Hughes–Stovin syndrome (HSS) is a rare autoimmune disorder often described as inflammation in relation to blood vessels, a form of vasculitis. It is not associated with any known cause and is typically characterized by multiple aneurysms in pulmonary arteries and deep vein thromboses. It is named after the two British physicians, John Patterson Hughes and Peter George Ingle Stovin, who first described it in 1959. HSS is presumed to be a rare variant of Behçet's disease, which entails more general problems with the circulatory system. Due to its clinical similarity with Behçet's disease, it has also been referred to as 'Incomplete Behçet's disease.' Most patients are young adult males between the age of 20–40. Common clinical presentations include fever, cough, dyspnea and hemoptysis. Radiological features are similar to those of Behçet's disease.

== Signs and symptoms ==
The signs and symptoms of the disease are mostly associated by the diagnostic feature of the disease, the presence of both pulmonary artery aneurysms and deep vein thromboses. Other symptoms to this disease are typically secondary to these two conditions, the common reported clinical symptoms present in patients are listed below;

- Multiple pulmonary aneurysms: secondary to the aneurysms present in the lung, other symptoms may persist, such as; cough, dyspnea (shortness of breath), chest pain and hemoptysis.
- Peripheral venous thrombosis
- Recurrent fever
- Chills
- intracranial hypertension: this is in relation with the vein thrombosis persistent with patients with HSS, due to blood constriction.
- pulmonary hypertension: this symptom is associated with the pulmonary aneurysms constricting lung capacity.

== Cause ==
The pathogenesis of this syndrome is still not clear and not complete, as there have not been enough studies on it, and therefore not enough published literature. It has been presumed that the possible causes of this syndrome include presence of infections and/or possibly angiodysplasia, characterized by vascular malformation of the gut. The possibility of the disease being a consequence of infections was ruled out as the use of antibiotics did not aid patients. Angiodysplasia could be an underlying cause of Hughes-Stovin as it can account for the vascular changes. As Hughes-Stovin syndrome is clinically considered an autoimmune disorder, the primary mechanism by which it precedes is presumed to be in the same manner as other autoimmune disorders, the syndrome occurs when the body begins attacking its own cells. This syndrome yields the inflammation of blood vessels in the body due to the body's overreactive immune system targeting affected cells. This causes coagulation, forming blood clots and begins the development of pulmonary aneurysms and thrombosis.

== Pathophysiology ==
The etiology or pathophysiology of the disease remains unclear. However, in recent years, Hughes-Stovin syndrome has been found to be potentially caused by systemic venous angiitis or collagen disease. Systemic venous angiitis or vasculitis is an inflammatory disease of the blood vessels walls, secondary to autoimmune diseases. It is essentially a T helper cell driven reaction, recruited by dendritic cells. The vascular impact can affect the blood circulation in the veins and thus give rise to the syndrome of Hughes-Stovin. It can occur in any type of artery or vein and cause the underlying main symptoms prevalent in the disease. This is presumed as Behçet's disease is caused by a similar form of vasculitis, and there is heavy vascular involvement in the disease.

== Diagnosis ==
There is no rigid set of diagnostic criteria for Hughes-Stovin. Hughes-Stovin can be discerned from similar conditions by its resemblance to vasculitis without a presenting infection. The syndrome is also identified as being associated with pulmonary/bronchial artery aneurysms and thrombophlebitis, without the known diagnostic symptoms and features of Behçet's disease (BD)." However physicians have often diagnosed Hughes-Stovin syndrome by using one or more of these techniques;

- Lab findings
- Bronchoscopy
- Ventilation/perfusion scan (V-Q): to examine air circulation in the lungs.
- Doppler ultrasound of extremities: this is a measure of the amount of blood flow in the body, particularly in the limbs.
- Radiological diagnosis: a. Chest roentgenograms b. Traditional angiography is often employed to characterize the severity and prognosis of the disease by evaluating the pulmonary aneurysms and assessing the angiodysplasia in bronchial arteries. c. Helical computed tomography d. Magnetic resonance angiography
- Histological diagnosis: This requires the assistance of a histologist to examine tissue under a microscope in order to diagnose disease.
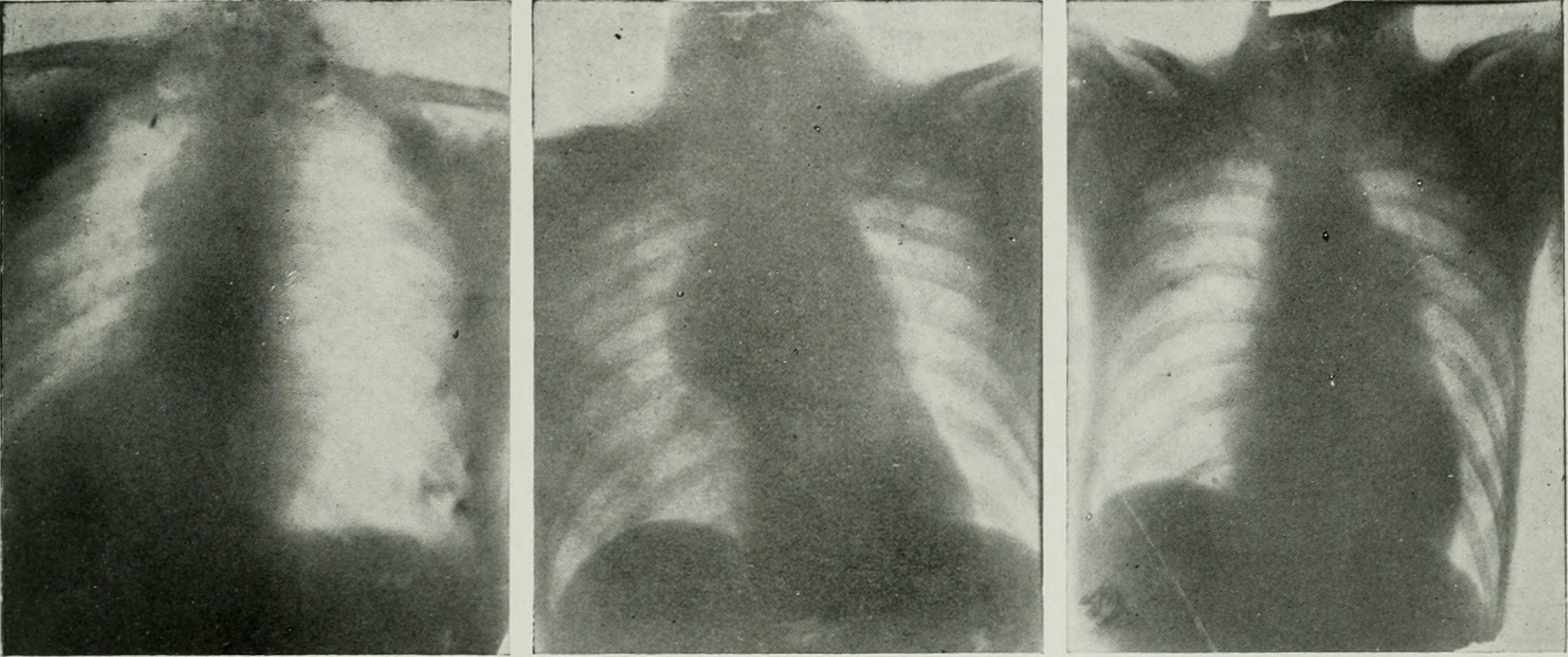
  Chest radiograph showing the presence of pulmonary arterial aneurysm. This is often employed in the diagnosis of the disease and allows for detecting the severity.

Physicians have to be able to differentiate between HSS and Behçet's disease, as HSS is often clinically considered a rare variant of this disease. The way they do this is through the absence of some of the more common symptoms of Behçet's disease, mouth and genital ulcers. Therefore, in the presence of multiple pulmonary artery aneurysms (PAA) and deep vein thrombosis, physicians differentiate between HSS and Behçet's disease and ultimately rule out Behçet's disease on the basis of the absence of skin-related findings.

== Management ==
There is currently no satisfactory treatment for this condition. Immunosuppressive therapy is the most common treatment, involving a mix of glucocorticoids and cyclophosphamide. This is most effective in the early stages and may cause remission of the aneurysms, but is ineffective once the disease has progressed. The administration of corticosteroids, a type of steroid hormones, in combination with cytotoxic agents aid in the stabilization of the pulmonary artery aneurysms.

Furthermore, the presence of thrombosis typically would require anticoagulants, however, they are typically not prescribed due to the possible life-threatening rupture of the pulmonary artery aneurysms. Therefore, if anticoagulants are given, this is done in extensive care and in special cases. Depending on the state of the pulmonary artery aneurysms, surgery might also be an option when the aneurysm is localized, this would improve the state of the patient.

== Prognosis ==
Hughes-Stovin syndrome compromises of vein dysfunctions, formation of thrombosis and pulmonary aneurysms. The disease is noted to proceed in three main clinical stages; the first stage observed is regarded as thrombophlebitis symptoms. Thrombophlebitis typically occurs in the presence of an inflammation or injury related to the veins, where a blood clot forms. It can also proceed by the occurrence of frequent coagulation caused by the body. The second clinical stage is the formation of pulmonary artery aneurysms. The mechanism of the formation of pulmonary aneurysms is typically a result of inflammation. In most cases, the third stage is associated with aneurysm ruptures and massive blood loss, possibly resulting in fatal consequences.

The syndrome is often detected very late in its precedence, relatively late in the course of the disease, therefore, it is associated with a significantly high rate of mortality. This is often associated with the high risk of blood loss as a result of a rupture of the pulmonary artery aneurysms or bronchial artery hypertrophy secondary to ischemia related to the pulmonary artery occlusion. The terminal events associated with this disease are typically due to the massive hemorrhage near lungs after rupture of the aneurysms. There is some existing evidence that suggests some success in managing the disease with immunosuppressive therapy, additionally, a lung transplant might also decrease the threat the disease presents.

== Epidemiology ==
HSS is a largely rare disorder with less than 50 published English literature or case studies, therefore, population based incidence has yet to be specified. However, the disorder has been reported to be more prevalent among men aged 12-40, the young adult bracket with much less reported female incidence. The reported cases show no preponderance for a specific geographic location as the cases vary in precedent countries. The reported cases show a diverse geographical locations of occurrence, to exemplify; North America, Africa, Europe and Asia, therefore, no geographic location preponderance as case studies have been published all over the world. There is also no reported significance of genetic background of any familial predisposition.

== Research directions ==
There are less than 50 published case studies in English on this condition; the available research is quite limited in providing thorough information on the syndrome. Therefore, some aspects of the illness are not adequately researched due to the lack of case reports. Authors have established a focus research group to establish the necessary information on Hughes-Stovin syndrome, the research group had been called HSS International Study Group, HSSISG. The research group hopes to gather available information on the syndrome to better assess the pathogenesis of the disease, its course of action and the way it progresses. This would allow the facilitation of early diagnosis and enhance the efficiency at which the syndrome is assessed, potentially reducing the risk of mortality. Recent research further emphasizes the need of early diagnosis, as multiple research presents patients with severe cases due to neglecting treatment.

Overall, the available research is limited in providing knowledge on the mechanism and course of the disease, however, multiple cited research articles present the disease as an incomplete form of Behçet's disease. Current research presume the disease proceeds in a manner similar to Behçet's disease, with similar symptoms except skin findings. Furthermore, current research heavily consists of case studies that allows us to depict the similarities of patients suffering from Hughes-Stovin syndrome. Presented research also stresses the importance of early diagnosis and treatment to improve the prognosis of the disease and prevent fatal consequences. There is a clear need for further research to further investigate genetic, etiological and pathological basis for the disease.
