= Bronchial artery embolization =

Treatment for airway bleeding

- Specialty: Pulmonology, interventional radiology

Bronchial artery embolization is a treatment for hemoptysis, abbreviated as BAE. It is a kind of catheter intervention to control hemoptysis (airway bleeding) by embolizing the bronchial artery, which is a bleeding source. Embolic agents are particulate embolic material such as gelatin sponge or polyvinyl alcohol (PVA), and liquid embolic material such as NBCA, or metallic coils.

== Basic principle ==
It is said that hemoptysis is caused by the formation of anomalous anastomosis (bronchial artery-pulmonary artery shunt) between the bronchial artery and the pulmonary artery, and if the bronchial artery is embolized, hemorrhage will cease. This is a fundamental concept of BAE. Traditionally, BAE was mostly performed as an emergency hemostatic procedure. Recently, it is often performed as an elective catheter treatment to prevent recurrence after massive hemoptysis, or control chronic repetitive hemoptysis. Although it is termed bronchial artery embolization, various systemic arteries other than the bronchial artery (non-bronchial arteries) also form a shunt with the pulmonary artery and cause hemoptysis. Therefore, it is common to embolize such non-bronchial arteries, but the expression of bronchial artery embolization, BAE, rather than the universal expression "arterial embolization" is more common. The therapeutic outcomes are improving, due to the combined approach such as spreading the treatment target to non-bronchial arteries, development of 3D-CT angiography following the development of MDCT, the advancement of devices such as coils and micro-catheters, and the evolution of therapeutic strategies. BAE has become the gold standard for hemoptysis for its dramatic improvement. Although the hemostatic effect is greatly affected by the underlying disease, some high-volume centers report a hemostatic rate of about 90.4% within one year of treatment, and 85.9% even in two years after treatment. The occlusion of the blood vessels in the brain, heart, and kidneys, which are supplied by the end arteries, can cause cerebral, myocardial, and renal infarctions. In BAE, both bronchial mucosal necrosis and pulmonary infarction seldom occur. It is presumed that this is because the pulmonary circulation is dually controlled by the bronchial artery and the pulmonary artery; and even if the blood flow in the bronchial artery is lost, blood flow from the pulmonary artery is slightly maintained. With non-bronchial arteries, it is empirically known that some collateral circulations also develop. In addition, direct hemorrhage from the pulmonary artery is rare (less than 5%), which requires embolization of the pulmonary artery.

== Treatment indications ==
BAE is effective for hemoptysis in most underlying diseases such as bronchiectasis, nontuberculous mycobacterial disease (NTM), cryptogenic hemoptysis, pulmonary aspergillosis, and pulmonary tuberculosis sequelae. According to Ishikawa who reported long-term treatment results of BAE for 489 hemoptysis patients, each underlying disease's ratio is 34.0%, 23.5%, 18.4%, 13.3%, 6.8%, respectively. Other diseases for which BAE is effective include lung abscess and pulmonary actinomycosis.

As for lung cancer, hemoptysis is caused mostly by bleeding from the tumor itself, and not by the bronchial-pulmonary artery shunt mechanism; embolism of the feeding vessels for the tumor causes necrosis of the cancer which may evoke massive hemoptysis. In addition, subsequent chemotherapy and endovascular treatment cannot be performed if the route of anticancer drugs is permanently obstructed. Lung cancer needs a different strategy. Seki et al. reported the usefulness of endovascular treatment for lung cancer hemoptysis. Kichang et al. reported BAE for hemoptysis in 84 lung cancer patients, and demonstrated that massive hemoptysis and cavity formation were significantly poor prognosis factors; re-hemoptysis rate was 23.8% in their follow-up period.

Even though BAE is currently considered the gold standard treatment for hemoptysis, Ishikawa et al. found that only 9065 patients (8.4%) out of 107,389 patients hospitalized for hemoptysis between 2010 and 2018 in Japan were treated with BAE. According to Ishikawa basically, all patients with hemoptysis who are admitted to the hospital are eligible for BAE, and the reason why BAE has been performed only in such a small number of patients is that there are still few facilities that can perform BAE,

Besides, among the 660 hospitals that performed BAE, half of them (334 centers) experienced less than one case per year. Centralization of hemoptysis treatment facilities will be necessary to increase the performance rate of BAE and to improve the quality of BAE.

== Treatment technique details ==
A catheter with a diameter of less than 2 mm is inserted at the base of the foot (femoral artery) or the artery in the wrist (radial artery). The tip of the catheter is inserted into the orifice of the bronchial artery (normally smaller than 1 mm) or other non-bronchial hemoptysis-related arteries. Contrast agent is injected through the catheter, and when abnormal findings are observed, such as systemic–pulmonary shunts, proliferations of the capillary vessels, or extravasation of the contrast medium to the lung tissues, they were super selectively embolized using the 3 Fr microcatheter system. A thinner microcatheter (about 0.8 mm) is passed through the catheter into the blood vessel, and then, embolic material is injected into the appropriate site. Thus, hemostasis is performed by ceasing or reducing the pressure applied to a bronchial (or non-bronchial)-pulmonary shunt (abnormal anastomosis). BAE is performed under local anesthesia, and the required time is about 1 hour to 3 hours.

== Effectiveness ==
In the past, BAE was mostly considered a palliative or a bridge therapy to surgical operation owing to the high rate of re-hemoptysis with BAE. But with the improvement in treatment strategy and devices, it is regarded as a permanent therapy for hemoptysis nowadays.

There are few facilities in which sophisticated BAE is feasible, and there are significant disparities between hospitals in the treatment quality and their experience. In most of the facilities, BAE is operated by interventional vascular radiology doctors, but in recent years, specialized high volume centers where a trained pulmonologist performs BAE are emerging. It is particularly effective for cryptogenic hemoptysis. Ando, Masuda et al. reported in their article that the hemostatic rate is 97% at 20 months, which is equivalent to the results of the article by Ishikawa. Ando, Masuda et al. state that micro bronchial aneurysms are involved in 22.9% of cryptogenic hemoptysis

For pulmonary aspergillosis, BAE was relatively less effective and was once thought to be contraindicated, but hemostatic rates have improved in recent years. Ando, Masuda et al. demonstrated that the re-hemoptysis rate was significantly higher in cases of disease progression.

The hemostatic rate in each underlying disease by Ishikawa is shown below. In this paper, both re-hemoptysis and death are defined as composite endpoints, and among these, only re-hemoptysis free rate is shown in the following table. It is originally a long-term performance data for 3 years; In the third year, the 95% confidence interval was too wide except for cryptogenic hemoptysis; hence, they are regarded as statistically unreliable figures. Therefore, the third year result is not posted here except for idiopathic hemoptysis. The poorest hemostatic rate after 2 years was observed in nontuberculous mycobacterial disease (NTM). The result shown by Okuda, Masuda et al. was similar (73.8%). It is considered to reflect the progressive nature of the disease.

Hemostatic rate by underground diseases
Underground diseases	1 year	2 year
Total	90.4%	85.9%
Bronchiectasis	87.6%	85.1%
NTM	89.0%	75.9%
Cryptogenic Hemoptysis	97.8%	97.8%
Pulmonary aspergillosis	86.4%	82.1%
Tb sequelae	91.3%	85.3%

Below are the treatment results summarized according to underlying diseases based on peer-reviewed papers published by Eishinkai Kishiwada Rehabilitation Hospital Hemoptysis and Pulmonary Circulation Center (EHPC), and The National Hospital Organization Tokyo Hospital Pulmonary Circulation and Hemoptysis Center (Tokyo Hp); the top two representatives of high-volume centers in Japan.

Cryptogenic Hemoptysis
	1year	2year	3year	Cases	Follow-up period
Tokyo Hp		97.0%		35	3 years
EHPC	97.8%	97.8%	97.8%	90	5.7 years

NTM
	1 year	2 year	3 year	Cases	Follow-up period
Tokyo Hp	79.1%	73.8%	63.3%	43	5 years
EHPC	89.0%	75.9%	N.A.	115	5.7 years

Aspergillosis
	1 year	2 year	3 year	Cases	Follow-up period
Tokyo Hp	65.8%	50.0%	47.9%	41	5 years
EHPC	86.4%	82.1%	N.A.	65	5.7 years

In cases of recurrence, re-BAE is possible to perform several times.

Furthermore, Takeda et al. showed that the 1, 2, 3, and 5-year hemostatic rates of bronchiectasis (without nontuberculous mycobacteriosis or pulmonary aspergillosis) were 91.3, 84.2, 81.5, and 78.9%, respectively. This paper is valuable for its long-term results of 5 years.

== Embolic material ==
These include polyvinyl alcohol (PVA), n-butyl-2-cyanoacrylate (NBCA), gelatin sponge, metallic coil, etc.

PVA - Woo et al. reported 406 cases of BAE long-term results, including 293 cases of PVA and 113 cases of NBCA.

NBCA - This is a kind of medical instant adhesive. Generally, there are many complications such as non-target blood vessel embolization and adhesion of catheter and vessel wall. However, in the article by Woo et al., major complication rate was 0%.

This kind has many advantages, such as low cost, instantaneous embolization, and very low recanalization rate since it does not depend on the patient's thrombus formation. It appears to be the best indication for traumatic bleeding control, particularly, in the peripheral bronchial aneurysms that the micro-catheter cannot access in BAE procedures, is a very good indication, and Mine, Hasebe et al. reported a technique called B-glue; NBCA combined with a balloon.

=== Gelatin sponge (GS) ===
Gelatin sponge (GS) is a transient embolic material, and in most cases, it dissolves within one to two weeks, and blood flow resumes. For this reason, it is important for emergency hemostatic purposes such as palliative treatment until surgery, which was the former positioning of BAE. GS is not suitable for the prevention of recurrence after massive hemoptysis or elective BAE for chronic repetitive hemoptysis. Wada et al. demonstrated that hemostatic rate was 24% (median follow-up time was 15 months) in their retrospective analysis of BAE for 33 patients using GS.

=== Metallic coil ===
There are three kinds of platinum vascular embolic coil. One is a detachable coil, which is expensive, but can be deployed repetitively until electric detach. This enables safest and fully controlled embolization. The second one is pushable coil, which is affordable, and allows for only one deployment. The third one is mechanical detachable coil; it has a moderate price range, and repetitive deployment is feasible. Ishikawa termed BAE with metallic coil as ssBACE, and published the world's largest number of cases of ssBACE long-term results in 2017. As described below, there are no reports on spinal cord ischemia in ssBACE, which is considered the most serious complication of BAE. This is one of the strongest merit of ssBACE.

Despite a rumor that it cannot be re-treated if ssBACE is performed once, Ryuge demonstrated in their article on "the mechanism of re-hemoptysis" that the technical success rate in re-BAE was at least 97.7%.

== Re-hemoptysis mechanism ==
Ryuge classified the re-hemoptysis mechanism after ssBACE into four as shown below. They also demonstrated that for the improvement of the long-term results in ssBACE in the future, suppressing recanalization is necessary.

Some readers misunderstand that 45.2% of the embolized coils recanalized. This, in fact, is the ratio of re-hemoptysis mechanism occurring in 9.6% cases in 1 year, and in 14.1% of those in 2 years.

Recanalization was the main cause of re-hemoptysis, and the suppression of new hemoptysis-related vessels, which is the second cause, cannot be controlled by the BAE procedure itself. It was shown that suppression of the recanalization was the key to improvement in ssBACE result in future.

Classification of the re-hemoptysis mechanism
Mechanism	Ratio	Explanation
Recanalization	45.2%	Blood flow recurrence in the embolized area
New HRA	38.5%	Totally new hemoptysis-related artery
Bridging collateral	14.7%	Collateral from the proximal of the same artery
Conventional collateral	1.7%	Collateral from the different artery

== Complications ==
Chest pain is the most common complication for who had undergone BAE, ranging from 24 to 91%. However, the symptom is temporary due to accidental embolisation of coronary artery supplying the heart. In the past, paraplegia caused by spinal cord ischemia due to erroneous embolization of the anterior spinal artery was well known as a rare, but serious complication. Super selective BAE using microcatheter reduced the incidence of the spinal ischemia.

However, according to Ishikawa et al., spinal cord infarction still occurs, with an incidence of 0.19% (16/8563).

They also compared it between three embolic agents (GS, NBCA, Coil) and demonstrated that the incidence of spinal cord infarction was significantly lower in coils: 0.06% (1/1577) compared with GS 0.18% (12/6561) and NBCA 0.71% (3/425) (p=0,04).

Major complications reported by Ishikawa et al. are presented below.

Mediastinal hematoma occurs by injury of hemoptysis-related vessel, mainly by wire, and can easily bail out by proximal coil embolization.

BAE complications (out of 489 cases)
Complications	Cases	Incidence
Mediastinal hematoma	5	1.0%
Symptomatic cerebellar infarction	2	0.4%
Aortic dissection	1	0.2%
Symptomatic Cerebral infarction	0	0%
Spinal ischemia	0	0%
Death	0	0%

== Improvement in mortality and quality of life ==
The majority of research on BAE was the single-center retrospective observational studies. Descriptive epidemiological studies using French medical big data is precious in that aspect. From the fall of 2020 to January 2021, a collaborative study led by the Yasunaga Laboratory of the University of Tokyo published two landmark papers using the Japanese medical database. One of them is a study by Ando et al. of the Department of Respiratory Medicine, University of Tokyo, which demonstrated for the first time in the world that early BAE (within three days after endotracheal intubation) significantly reduced in-hospital mortality in patients with severe hemoptysis on ventilators (30 days): 7.5% in the early BAE group vs. 16.8% in the non-early BAE group. (odds ratio, 0.45; 95% CI, 0.28-0.73; p = 0.001).

Omachi et al. of the Hemoptysis and Pulmonary Circulation Center, Kishiwada Rehabilitation Hospital, demonstrated for the first time in the world that elective BAE with coils significantly improved the quality of life of hemoptysis patients(single-center prospective observational study). In this study, both physical and mental QOL improved significantly after BAE, especially the latter.

== Main evidence for BAE ==
The evidence base for bronchial artery embolization includes systematic reviews, society recommendations, single-center cohort studies, and national administrative database studies. A systematic review published in 2017 summarized studies of BAE for hemoptysis and reported that BAE was widely used as an interventional treatment for massive, recurrent, or surgically unsuitable hemoptysis, although recurrence rates varied substantially among studies. The 2022 CIRSE Standards of Practice also summarized contemporary indications, pre-procedural assessment, embolic materials, complications, and follow-up after BAE.

Long-term outcome studies have shown that recurrence after BAE is influenced by the underlying disease, completeness of embolization, embolic material, and development of new or collateral systemic arteries. In a single-center study of super-selective bronchial artery coil embolization, Ishikawa and colleagues reported outcomes in 489 patients treated with coils. A subsequent study of recurrent hemoptysis after coil embolization classified recurrence mechanisms as recanalization, development of new hemoptysis-related arteries, bridging collaterals, and conventional collaterals.

National database studies have provided evidence on mortality and rare complications. In mechanically ventilated patients with hemoptysis, early arterial embolization was associated with lower 7-day and 30-day mortality than no early embolization. Another nationwide Japanese study reported that spinal cord infarction after BAE occurred in 0.19% of cases and found variation according to embolic material. More recently, a national administrative database study of 7,277 patients undergoing BAE in Japan reported poor overall prognosis after hospitalization for hemoptysis and found that coil use, compared with gelatin sponge, was associated with a lower incidence of all-cause mortality.

Other studies have addressed quality of life, bronchial artery aneurysm, and the contribution of non-bronchial systemic arteries. A prospective observational study found improvement in health-related quality of life after BAE for hemoptysis. Bronchial artery aneurysm and non-bronchial systemic culprit arteries have also been described in cohort studies, expanding the anatomical and clinical framework of BAE beyond the bronchial arteries alone.

An editorial published in 2026 emphasized the paradox that BAE is regarded as a standard treatment for clinically significant hemoptysis but remains underused in routine practice. It discussed barriers including limited access to experienced operators and specialized centers, concerns about spinal cord infarction, variation in embolic material selection, and delays in referral pathways, and called for better treatment systems, training, multidisciplinary collaboration, and prospective multicenter research.
