= Interatrial sulcus =

Furrow between the upper heart chambers

The interatrial sulcus, separating the two atria, is scarcely marked on the posterior surface, while anteriorly it is hidden by the pulmonary artery and aorta.
