= Bronchial veins =

Details
- Drains to: Azygos vein, hemiazygos vein and pulmonary veins
- Artery: Bronchial artery

Identifiers
- Latin: venae bronchiales
- TA98: A12.3.04.009; A12.3.07.007
- TA2: 4752
- FMA: 70832

The bronchial veins are small vessels that return blood from the larger bronchi and structures at the roots of the lungs. The right side drains into the azygos vein, while the left side drains into the left superior intercostal vein or the accessory hemiazygos vein. Bronchial veins are thereby part of the bronchial circulation, carrying waste products away from the cells that constitute the lungs.

The bronchial veins are counterparts to the bronchial arteries. However, they only carry ~13% of the blood flow of the bronchial arteries. The remaining blood is returned to the heart via the pulmonary veins.

== See also ==
- Bronchial arteries
- Pulmonary arteries
- Pulmonary veins
