= Bronchial circulation =

Circulation of blood supplying lungs tissues

The bronchial circulation is the part of the systemic circulation that supplies nutrients and oxygen to the cells that constitute the lungs, as well as carrying waste products away from them. It is complementary to the pulmonary circulation that brings deoxygenated blood to the lungs and carries oxygenated blood away from them in order to oxygenate the rest of the body.

In the bronchial circulation, blood goes through the following steps:

1. Bronchial arteries carry oxygenated blood to the lungs
2. Pulmonary capillaries, where there is exchange of water, oxygen, carbon dioxide, and many other nutrients and waste chemical substances between blood and the tissues
3. Bronchial veins drain venous blood from the large main bronchi into the azygous vein, and ultimately the right atrium. Venous blood from the bronchi inside the lungs drains into the pulmonary veins and empties into the left atrium; since this blood never went through a capillary bed it was never oxygenated and so provides a small amount of shunted deoxygenated blood into the systemic circulation.

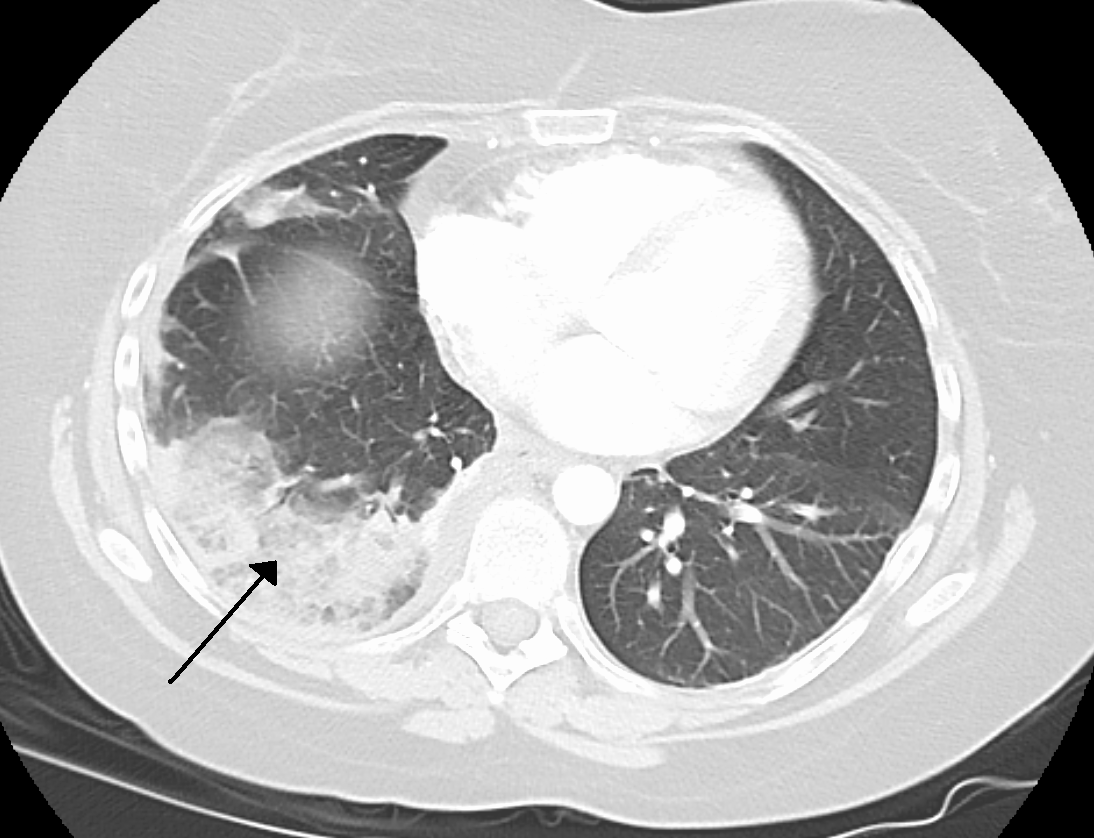
Infarction of the lung due to a pulmonary embolism

Blood reaches from the pulmonary circulation into the lungs for gas exchange to oxygenate the rest of the body tissues. But bronchial circulation supplies fully oxygenated arterial blood to the lung tissues themselves. This blood supplies the bronchi and the pleurae to meet their nutritional requirements.

Because of the dual blood supply to the lungs from both the bronchial and the pulmonary circulation, this tissue is more resistant to infarction. An occlusion of the bronchial circulation does not cause infarction, but it can still occur in pulmonary embolism when the pulmonary circulation is blocked and the bronchial circulation cannot fully compensate for it.
