= Ground-glass opacity =

Radiologic sign on radiographs and computed tomography scans

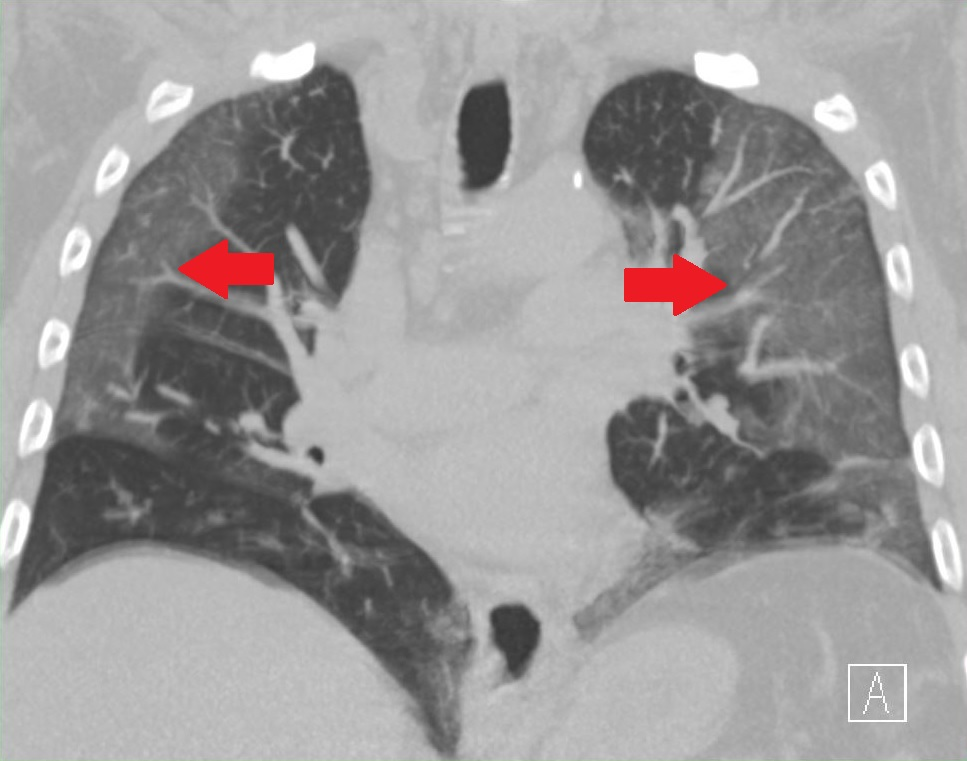
High-resolution CT image showing ground-glass opacities in the periphery of both lungs in a patient with COVID-19 (red arrows). The adjacent normal lung tissue with lower attenuation appears as darker areas.

Ground-glass opacity (GGO) is a finding seen on chest x-ray (radiograph) or computed tomography (CT) imaging of the lungs. It is typically defined as an area of hazy opacification (x-ray) or increased attenuation (CT) due to air displacement by fluid, airway collapse, fibrosis, or a neoplastic process. When a substance other than air fills an area of the lung it increases that area's density. On both x-ray and CT, this appears more grey or hazy as opposed to the normally dark-appearing lungs. Although it can sometimes be seen in normal lungs, common pathologic causes include infections, interstitial lung disease, and pulmonary edema.

== Definition ==
In both CT and chest radiographs, normal lungs appear dark due to the relative lower density of air compared to the surrounding tissues. When air is replaced by another substance (e.g. fluid or fibrosis), the density of the area increases, causing the tissue to appear lighter or more grey.

Ground-glass opacity is most often used to describe findings in high-resolution CT imaging of the thorax, although it is also used when describing chest radiographs. In CT, the term refers to one or multiple areas of increased attenuation (density) without concealment of the pulmonary vasculature. This appears more grey, as opposed to the normally dark-appearing (air-filled) lung on CT imaging. In chest radiographs, the term refers to one or multiple areas in which the normally darker-appearing (air-filled) lung appears more opaque, hazy, or cloudy. Ground-glass opacity is in contrast to consolidation, in which the pulmonary vascular markings are obscured. GGO can be used to describe both focal and diffuse areas of increased density. Subtypes of GGOs include diffuse, nodular, centrilobular, mosaic, crazy paving, halo sign, and reversed halo sign.

== Causes ==
The differential diagnosis for ground-glass opacities is broad. General etiologies include infections, interstitial lung diseases, pulmonary edema, pulmonary hemorrhage, and neoplasm. A correlation of imaging with a patient's clinical features is useful in narrowing the diagnosis. GGOs can be seen in normal lungs. Upon expiration there is less air in the lungs, leading to a relative increase in density of the tissue, and thus increased attenuation on CT. Furthermore, when a patient lays supine for a CT scan, the posterior lungs are in a dependent position, causing partial collapse of the posterior alveoli. This leads to an increase in density of the tissue, resulting increased attenuation and a possible ground-glass appearance on CT.

=== Infectious causes ===
In the setting of pneumonia, the presence of GGO (as opposed to consolidation) is a useful diagnostic clue. Most bacterial infections lead to lobar consolidation, while atypical pneumonias may cause GGOs. While many of the pulmonary infections listed below may lead to GGOs, this does not occur in every case.

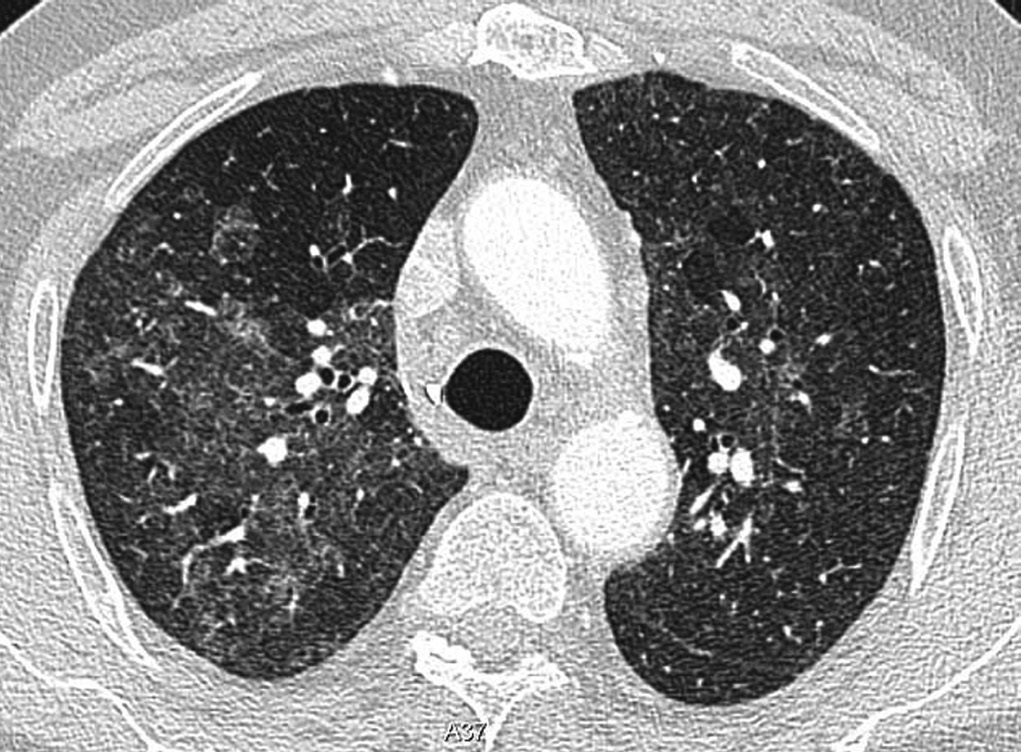
High-Resolution CT image in a patient with Pneumocystis pneumonia infection showing ground-glass opacities.

==== Bacterial ====
- Diffuse
  - Mycoplasma pneumoniae
  - Chlamydia pneumoniae
  - Legionella pneumophila
- Focal or nodular
  - Mycobacterium
  - Nocardia
  - Septic emboli

==== Viral ====
- Adenovirus
- Coronavirus (including MERS-CoV, SARS-CoV, and SARS-CoV-2)
- Cytomegalovirus (CMV)
- Herpes Simplex Virus (HSV)
- Human metapneumovirus (HMPV)
- Influenza
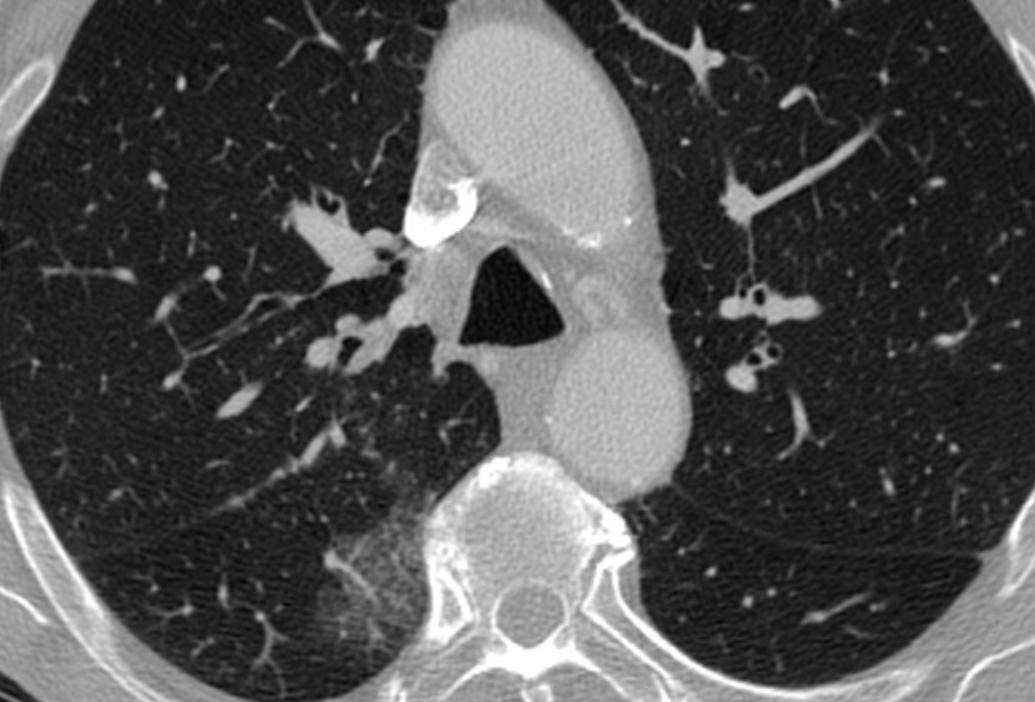
  CT image showing ground-glass opacification in the posterior of the right lung (screen left).
- Measles
- Respiratory Syncytial Virus (RSV)
- Varicella zoster

==== Fungal ====
- Pneumocystis jirovecii (PCP)
- Invasive aspergillosis
- Candidiasis
- Mucormycosis
- Pulmonary cryptococcus
- Paracoccidioidomycosis

==== Parasitic ====
- Pulmonary Schistosomiasis

=== Non-infectious causes ===
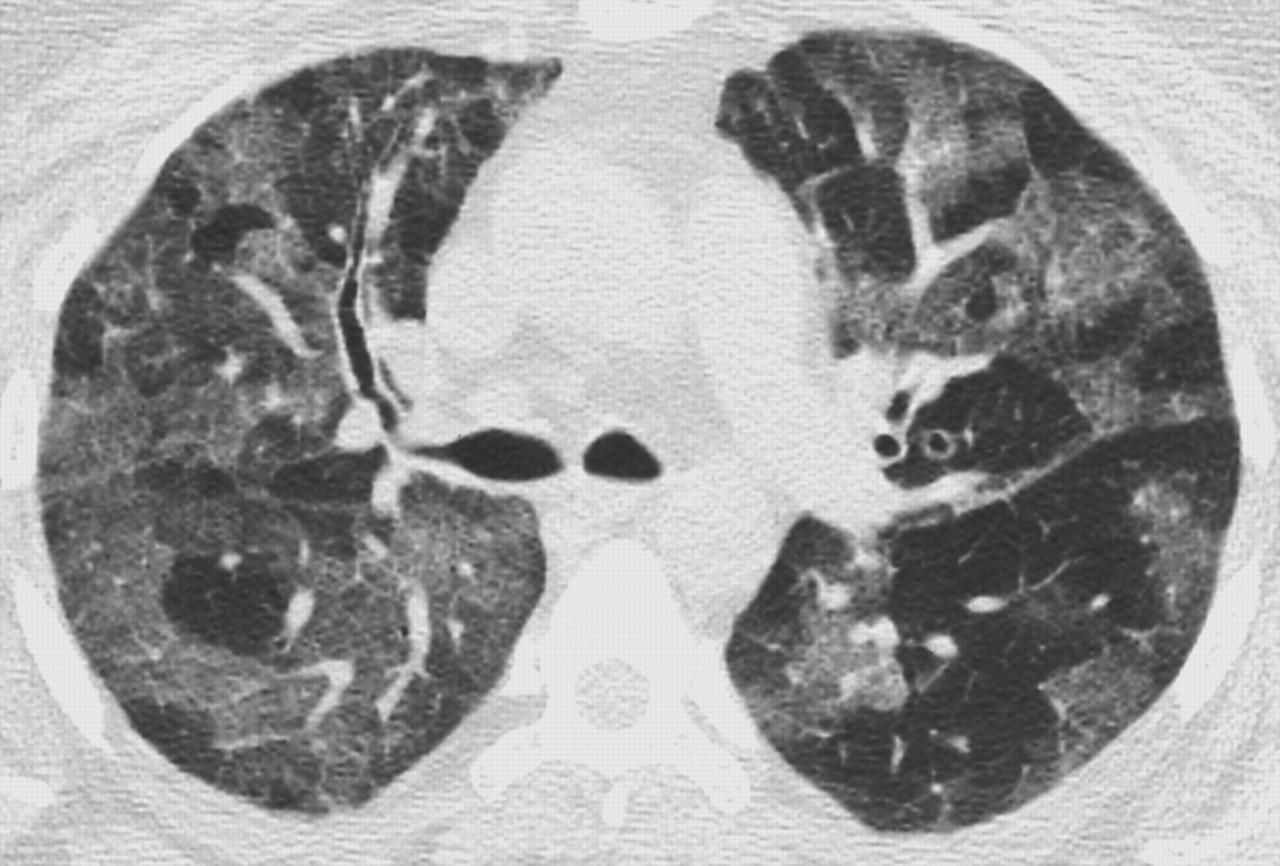
CT image showing patchy areas of ground-glass opacities representing pulmonary edema.

==== Exposures ====
- Aspiration pneumonitis
- Drug toxicity (most common include cyclophosphamide, amiodarone, carmustine, methotrexate, and bleomycin)
- Hypersensitivity pneumonitis
- EVALI
- Radiation pneumonitis

==== Idiopathic interstitial pneumonia ====
- Acute interstitial pneumonitis
- Desquamative interstitial pneumonia
- Lymphocytic interstitial pneumonia
- Non-specific interstitial pneumonia
- Cryptogenic organizing pneumonia

==== Neoplastic processes ====
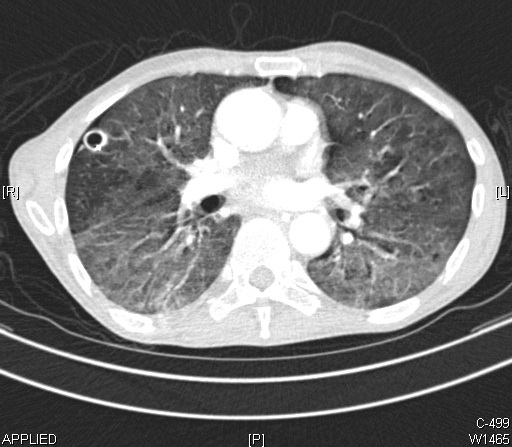
- CT image showing diffuse GGOs throughout both lungs. An abscess is also noted in the right lung (screen left).
  Lung adenocarcinoma
- Adenocarcinoma in situ of the lung
- Atypical adenomatous hyperplasia

==== Additional causes ====
- Acute eosinophilic pneumonia
- Cholesterol granulomas
- Focal interstitial fibrosis
- Granulomatosis with polyangiitis
- Lymphatoid granulomatosis
- Pulmonary alveolar proteinosis
- Pulmonary calcifications
- Pulmonary capillary hemangiomatosis
- Pulmonary contusion
- Pulmonary edema
- Pulmonary hemorrhage
- Pulmonary infarction
- Sarcoidosis
- Thoracic endometriosis

== Patterns ==
There are seven general patterns of ground-glass opacities. When combined with a patient's clinical signs and symptoms, the GGO pattern seen on imaging is useful in narrowing the differential diagnosis. While some disease processes present as only one pattern, many can present with a mixture of GGO patterns.

=== Diffuse ===
The diffuse pattern typically refers to GGOs in multiple lobes of one or both lungs. Broadly, a diffuse pattern of GGO can be caused by displacement of air with fluid, inflammatory debris, or fibrosis. Cardiogenic pulmonary edema and ARDS are common causes of a fluid-filled lung. Diffuse alveolar hemorrhage is a rarer cause of diffuse GGO seen in some types of vasculitis, autoimmune conditions, and bleeding disorders.

Inflammation and fibrosis can also cause diffuse GGOs. Pneumocystis pneumonia, an infection typically seen in immunocompromised (e.g. patients with AIDS) or immunosuppressed individuals, is a classic cause of diffuse GGOs. Many viral pneumonias and idiopathic interstitial pneumonias can also lead to a diffuse GGO pattern. Radiation pneumonitis, a side effect of pulmonary radiation therapy, can lead to pulmonary fibrosis and diffuse GGOs.

=== Nodular ===
There are numerous potential causes of nodular GGOs which can be broadly separated into benign and malignant conditions. Benign conditions potentially leading to the formation of nodular GGOs include aspergillosis, acute eosinophilic pneumonia, focal interstitial fibrosis, granulomatosis with polyangiitis, IgA vasculitis, organizing pneumonia, pulmonary contusion, pulmonary cryptococcus, and thoracic endometriosis. Focal interstitial fibrosis presents a unique challenge when differentiating from malignant nodular GGOs on CT imaging. It is typically persistent over long-term imaging follow-up and shares a similar appearance to malignant nodular GGOs.

Pre-malignant or malignant causes of nodular GGOs include adenocarcinoma, adenocarcinoma in situ, and atypical adenomatous hyperplasia (AAH). One large review study found that 80% of nodular GGOs which were present on repeated CT imaging represented either pre-malignant or malignant growths. Differentiating between pre-malignancy and malignancy on the basis of CT alone can pose a challenge to radiologists; however, there are several features that are indicative of pre-malignant nodules. AAH is a pre-malignant cause of nodular GGO and is more commonly associated with lower attenuation on CT and smaller nodule size (<10 mm) compared to adenocarcinoma. In addition, AAH often lacks the solid features and spiculated appearance that are often associated with malignant growths. In contrast, as adenocarcinoma becomes invasive it will more often cause retraction of adjacent pleura and may show an increase in vascular markings. Nodules >15 mm almost always represent an invasive adenocarcinoma.

=== Centrilobular ===
Centrilobular GGOs refer to opacities occurring within one or multiple secondary lobules of the lung, which consist of a respiratory bronchiole, small pulmonary artery, and the surrounding tissue. A defining feature of these GGOs is the lack of involvement of the interlobular septum. Potential causes of centrilobular GGOs include pulmonary calcifications from metastatic disease, some types of idiopathic interstitial pneumonias, hypersensitivity pneumonitis, aspiration pneumonitis, cholesterol granulomas, and pulmonary capillary hemangiomastosis.

=== Mosaic ===
A mosaic pattern of GGO refers to multiple irregular areas of both increased attenuation and decreased attenuation on CT. It is often the result of occlusion of small pulmonary arteries or obstruction of small airways leading to air trapping. Sarcoidosis is an additional cause of a mosaic GGOs due to the formation of granulomas in interstitial areas. This may coexist with granulomatosis with polyangiitis, leading to diffuse areas of increased attenuation with ground-glass appearance.

=== Crazy paving ===
The crazy paving pattern may occur when there is both interlobular and intralobular widening. This sometimes resembles a road paved with irregular bricks or tiles. It is typically diffuse, involving larger areas of one or multiple lobes. There are a variety of potential causes, including Pneumocystis pneumonia, late-stage adenocarcinoma, pulmonary edema, some types of idiopathic interstitial pneumonias, diffuse alveolar hemorrhage, sarcoidosis, and pulmonary alveolar proteinosis. COVID-19 has also been shown to occasionally cause GGOs with a crazy paving pattern.

=== Halo sign ===
A halo sign refers to a GGO that fills the area around a consolidation or nodule. This is a most commonly seen in various types of pulmonary infections, including CMV pneumonia, tuberculosis, nocardia infection, some fungal pneumonias, and septic emboli. Schistosomiasis, a parasitic infection, also commonly presents with the halo sign. Important non-infectious causes include granulomatosis with polyangiitis, metastatic disease with pulmonary hemorrhage, and some types of idiopathic interstitial pneumonias.

=== Reversed halo sign ===
A reversed halo sign is a central ground-glass opacity surrounded by denser consolidation. According to published criteria, the consolidation should form more than three-fourths of a circle and be at least 2 mm thick. It is often suggestive of organizing pneumonia, but is only seen in about 20% of individuals with this condition. It can also be present in lung infarction where the halo consists of hemorrhage, as well as in infectious diseases such as paracoccidioidomycosis, tuberculosis, and aspergillosis, as well as in granulomatosis with polyangiitis, lymphomatoid granulomatosis, and sarcoidosis.

CT showing diffuse ground-glass opacities in periphery of both lungs in patient with COVID-19.

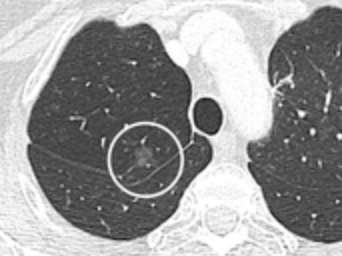
CT image showing ground-glass nodule (circled).

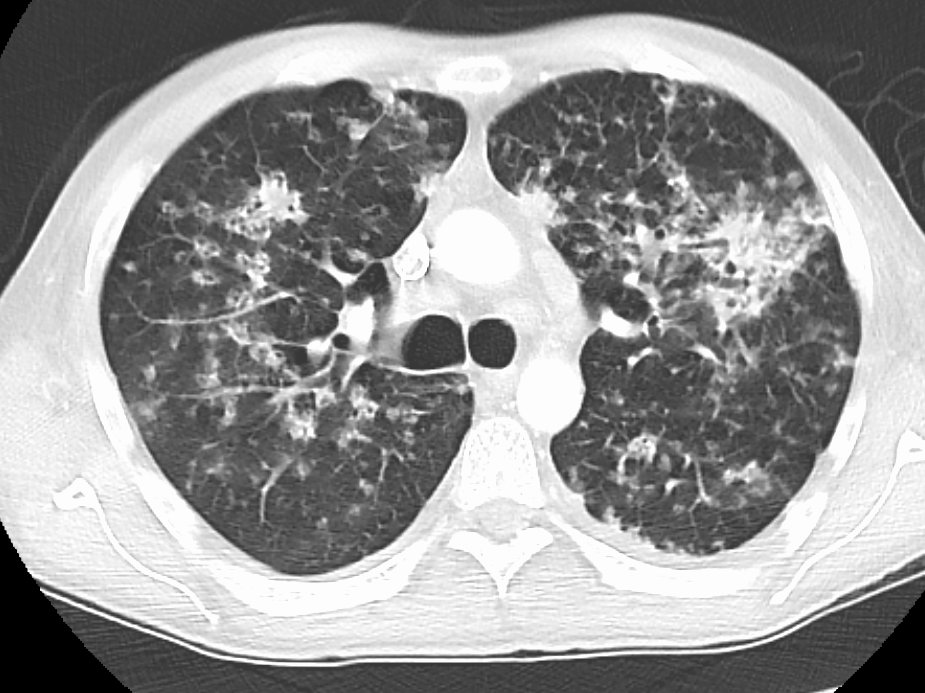
CT image showing centrilobular pattern of GGOs in patient with pulmonary tuberculosis. Note the small, nodular areas of increased attenuation in both lungs.

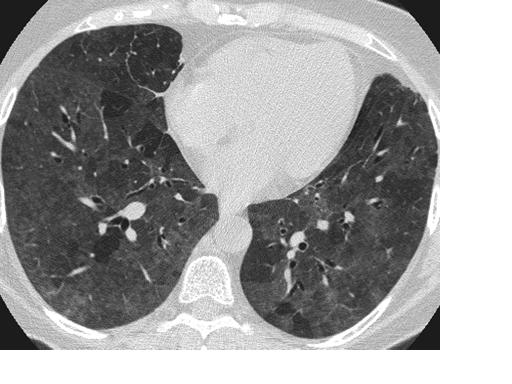
CT image showing mosaic attenuation pattern in patient with hypersensitivity pneumonitis. Note the alternating, patchy areas of increased and decreased attenuation, particularly in the left lung (screen right).

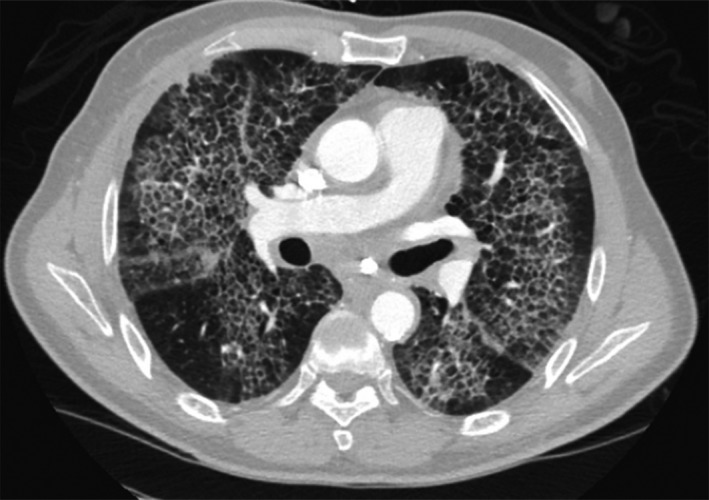
CT image showing crazy paving pattern of ground-glass opacities in both lungs.

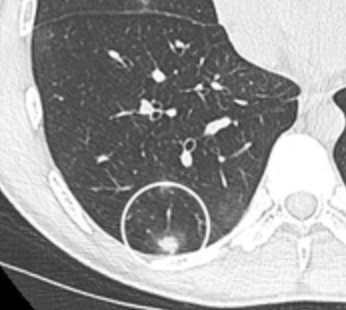
CT image showing halo sign in patient with pulmonary aspergillosis. Note ground-glass opacification surrounding the area of consolidation (circled).

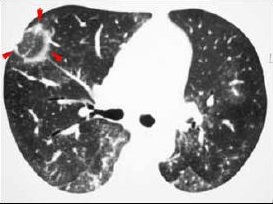
CT image of reversed halo sign in patient with organizing pneumonia.

== COVID-19 ==
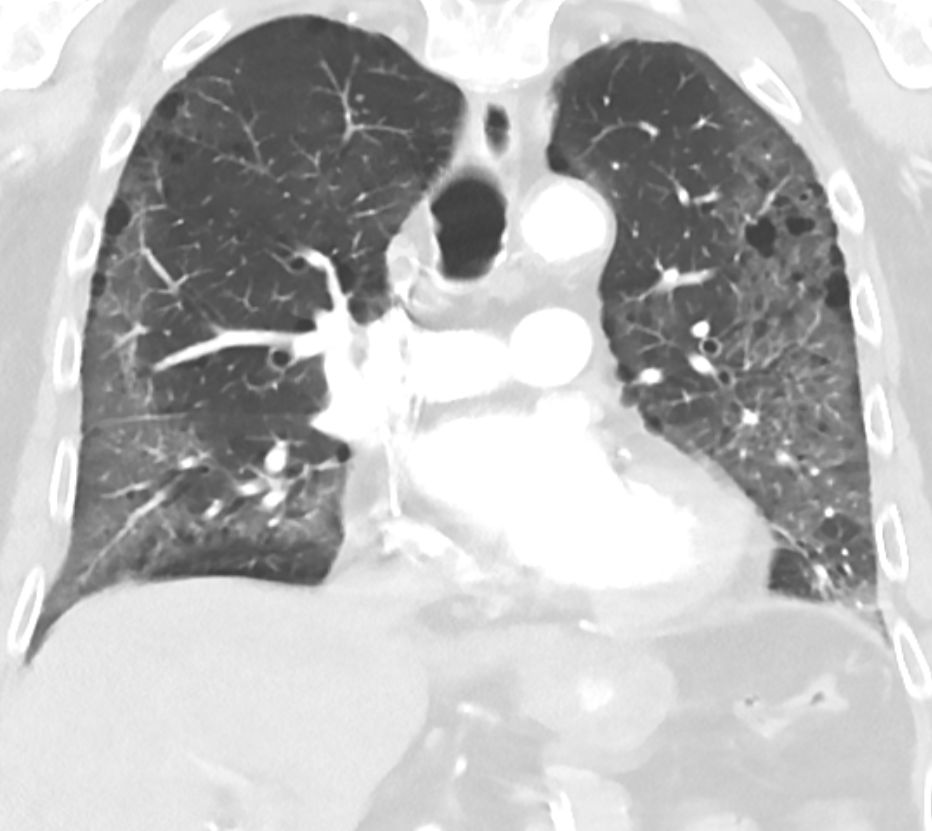
CT image in patient with COVID-19 showing bilateral ground-glass opacities at the periphery of both lungs.

Ground-glass opacity is among the most common imaging findings in patients with confirmed COVID-19. One systematic review found that among patients with COVID-19 and abnormal lung findings on CT, greater than 80% had GGOs, with greater than 50% having mixed GGOs and consolidation. GGOs with mixed consolidation has most often been found in elderly populations. Several studies have described a pattern among initial, intermediate, and hospital discharge imaging findings in the disease course of COVID-19. Most commonly, initial CT imaging reveals bilateral GGOs at the periphery of the lungs. During initial stages, this is most often found in the lower lobes, although involvement of the upper lobes and right middle lobe has also been reported early in the disease course. This is in contrast to the two similar coronaviruses, SARS and MERS, which more commonly involve only one lung on initial imaging. As the COVID-19 infection progresses, GGOs typically become more diffuse and often progress to consolidation. This is sometimes accompanied by the development of a crazy paving pattern and interlobular septal thickening. In many cases the most severe pulmonary CT abnormalities occurred within 2 weeks after symptoms began. At this point, many individuals begin showing resolution of consolidation and GGOs as symptoms improve. However, some patients have worsening symptoms and imaging findings, with further increase in septal thickening, GGOs, and consolidation. These patients may develop lung "white-out" with progression to acute respiratory distress syndrome (ARDS) requiring treatment escalation.

Preliminary reports have shown many patients have residual GGOs at time of discharge from the hospital. Due to the novelty of COVID-19, large studies investigating the long-term pulmonary CT changes have yet to be completed. However, long-term pulmonary changes have been seen in patients after recovery from SARS and MERS, suggesting the possibility of similar long-term complications in patients who have recovered from acute COVID-19 infection.

== History ==
The first usage of "ground-glass opacity" by a major radiological society occurred in a 1984 publication of the American Journal of Roentgenology. It was published as part of a glossary of recommended nomenclature from the Fleischner Society, a group of thoracic imaging radiologists. The original published definition read as: "Any extended, finely granular pattern of pulmonary opacity within which normal anatomic details are partly obscured; from a fancied resemblance to etched or abraded glass." It was again included in an updated glossary by the Fleischner Society in 2008 with a more detailed definition.

== See also ==
- Pulmonary consolidation
- Pulmonary infiltrate
