= Bronchial artery =

Blood vessels supplying the lungs

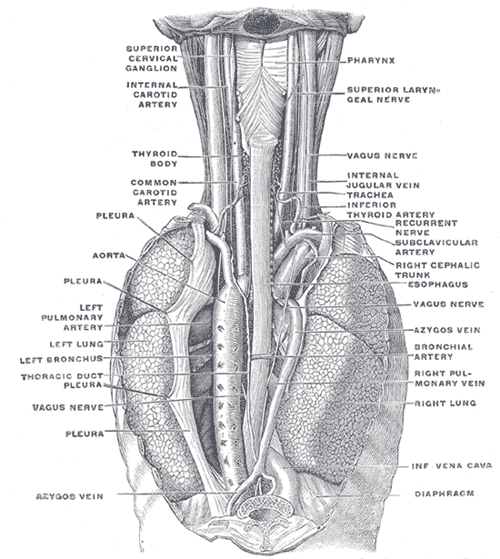
- Bronchial artery labeled at center right

Details
- Source: Thoracic aorta
- Vein: Bronchial veins
- Supplies: Lungs

Identifiers
- Latin: arteriae bronchiales, rami bronchiales partis thoracicae aortae
- MeSH: D001981
- TA98: A12.2.11.002
- TA2: 4187
- FMA: 68109 71536, 68109

In human anatomy, the bronchial arteries supply the lungs with oxygenated blood, and nutrition. Although there is much variation, there are usually two bronchial arteries that run to the left lung, and one to the right lung, and are a vital part of the respiratory system.

== Structure ==
There are typically two left and one right bronchial arteries.

The left bronchial arteries (superior and inferior) usually arise directly from the thoracic aorta.

The single right bronchial artery may arise from one of the following:

- 1) in typical anatomy, the thoracic aorta at a common trunk with the right-sided first posterior intercostal artery (known as the intercostobronchial trunk).
- 2) the superior bronchial artery on the left side.
- 3) any number of the right intercostal arteries mostly the third right posterior.

== Function ==
The bronchial arteries supply blood to the bronchi and connective tissue of the lungs. They travel with and branch with the bronchi, ending about at the level of the respiratory bronchioles. They anastomose with the branches of the pulmonary arteries, and together, they supply the visceral pleura of the lung in the process.

Note that much of the oxygenated blood supplied by the bronchial arteries is returned via the pulmonary veins rather than the bronchial veins. As a consequence, blood returning to the left heart is slightly less oxygenated than blood found at the level of the pulmonary capillary beds.

Each bronchial artery also has a branch that supplies the esophagus.

=== Comparison with pulmonary arteries ===
It is easy to confuse the bronchial arteries with the pulmonary arteries, because they both supply the lungs with blood, but there are important differences:

artery	function	circulation	diameter
pulmonary arteries	supplies deoxygenated blood pumped from the right ventricle	pulmonary circulation	relatively large
bronchial arteries	supplies oxygenated blood pumped from the left ventricle	systemic circulation	relatively small

== Clinical significance ==
Bronchial artery is considered dilated when its diameter is more than 2 mm. Several causes of bronchial artery dilatations are: congenital heart or lung diseases, obstructions of pulmonary artery, and lung inflammation.

The bronchial arteries are typically enlarged and tortuous in chronic pulmonary thromboembolic hypertension.

With modern surgical techniques, bronchial anastomoses heal well without bronchial artery reconnection. Largely for this reason, bronchial artery circulation is usually sacrificed during lung transplants, instead relying on the persistence of a microcirculation (presumably arising from the deoxygenated pulmonary circulation) to provide perfusion to the airways.

Aneurysms of the bronchial artery may mimic aortic aneurysms. Bronchial artery embolisation (BAE) is catheter insertion into a bronchial artery to treat hemoptysis (coughing blood). Most lung tumors are supplied by the bronchial artery, and they can be treated by chemoembolization (injecting chemotherapy and particles directly into the tumor-feeding artery).

The bronchial arteries and their supply of nutrients to the lungs are also attributed to the observation that an occluded (either ligated or by an embolus) pulmonal artery very rarely results in lung infarction. The bronchial arteries can maintain a supply of oxygenated blood to lung tissue.

== See also ==
- Bronchial veins
- Pulmonary thromboendarterectomy
