= Pulmonary artery =

Artery in pulmonary circulation carrying deoxygenated blood from heart to lungs

- Anterior (frontal) view of the opened heart. White arrows indicate normal blood flow. (Pulmonary artery labelled at upper right.)

Details
- Precursor: Truncus arteriosus
- System: Cardiovascular, respiratory
- Source: Right ventricle

Identifiers
- Latin: arteria pulmonalis
- MeSH: D011651
- TA2: 4074
- FMA: 66326

A pulmonary artery is an artery in the pulmonary circulation that carries deoxygenated blood from the right side of the heart to the lungs. The largest pulmonary artery is the main pulmonary artery or pulmonary trunk from the heart, and the smallest ones are the arterioles, which lead to the capillaries that surround the pulmonary alveoli.

== Structure ==
The pulmonary arteries are blood vessels that carry systemic venous blood from the right ventricle of the heart to the microcirculation of the lungs. Unlike in other organs where arteries supply oxygenated blood, the blood carried by the pulmonary arteries is deoxygenated, as it is venous blood returning to the lungs. The main pulmonary arteries emerge from the right side of the heart and then split into smaller arteries that progressively divide and become arterioles, eventually narrowing into the capillary microcirculation of the lungs where gas exchange occurs.

=== Pulmonary trunk ===
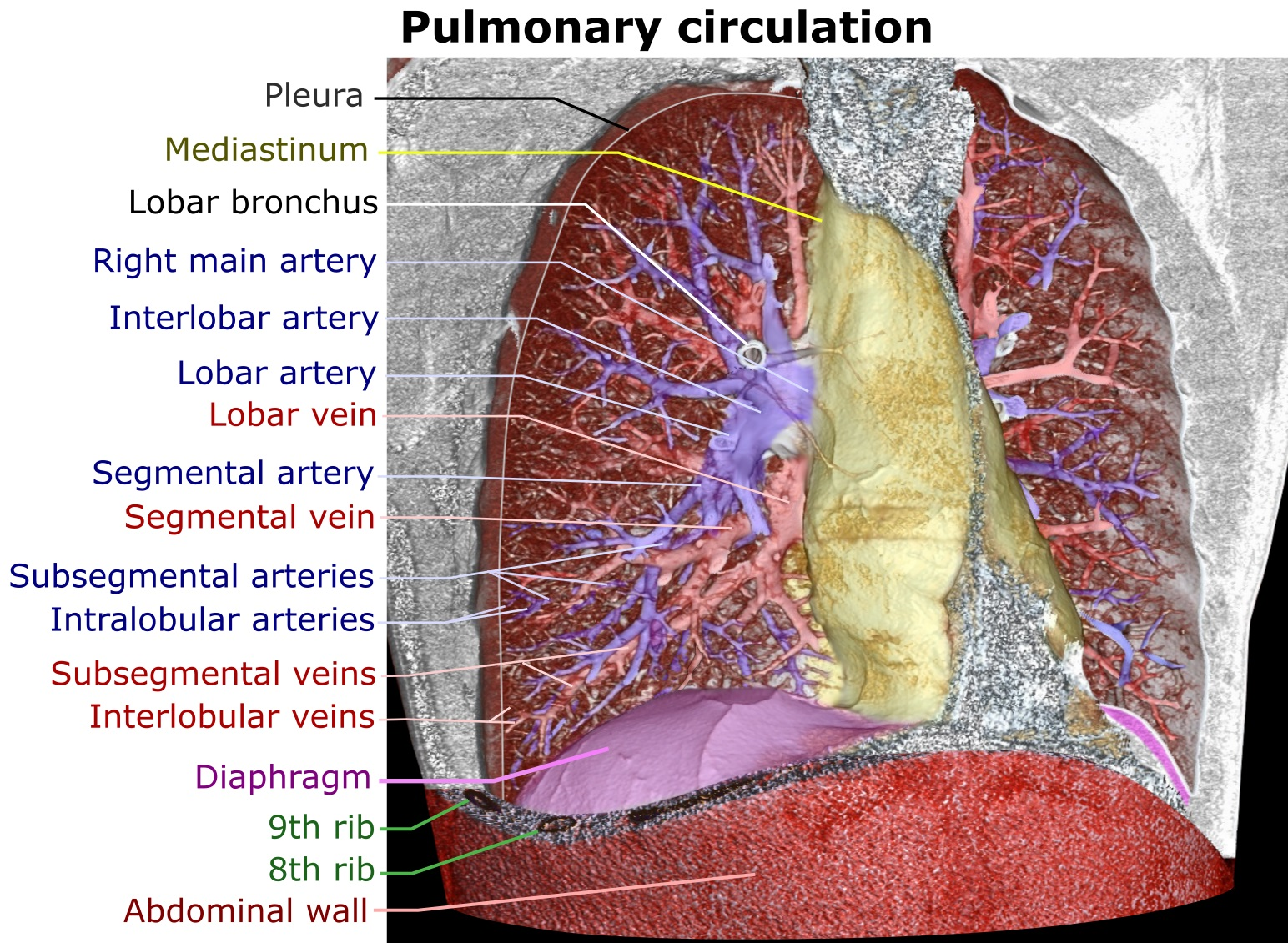
Volume rendering of a high resolution CT scan of the thorax. The anterior thoracic wall, the airways and the pulmonary vessels anterior to the root of the lung have been digitally removed to visualize the different levels of the pulmonary circulation.

In order of blood flow, the pulmonary arteries start as the pulmonary trunk that leaves the fibrous pericardium (parietal pericardium) of the ventricular outflow tract of right ventricle (also known as infundibulum or conus arteriosus. The outflow track runs superiorly and to the left, posterior to the pulmonary valve. The pulmonary trunk bifurcates into right and left pulmonary arteries below the arch of aorta and in front of the left main bronchus. Pulmonary trunk is short and wide – approximately 5 centimetres (2.0 in) in length and 2 centimetres (0.79 in)-3 centimetres (1.2 in) in diameter.

The pulmonary trunk splits into the right and the left main pulmonary artery. The left main pulmonary artery is shorter than the right, passes behind and downwards the descending aorta and above the left main bronchus to the root of the left lung. Above, the left main pulmonary artery is connected to the concavity of the proximal descending aorta by the ligamentum arteriosum. The right pulmonary artery passes across the midline of the body, below the carina of trachea, and comes in front of the right main bronchus.

=== Branches ===
At the far end, pulmonary arteries (labelled at the bottom) become capillaries at the pulmonary alveoli.

The left main pulmonary artery then divides into two lobar arteries, one for each lobe of the left lung.

At the right root of the lung, it bifurcates into artery that supplies the right upper lobe of the lung, in front of the right upper lobe bronchus, and interlobar artery that supplies the right middle and inferior lobes of the lung, running together with bronchus intermedius.

The right and left main pulmonary (lungs) arteries give off branches that supplies the corresponding lung lobes. In such cases it is termed lobar arteries. The lobar arteries branch into segmental arteries (roughly 1 for each segment). Segmental arteries run together with segmental bronchi, at the posterolateral surfaces of the bronchi. These in turn branch into subsegmental pulmonary arteries. These eventually form intralobular arteries. The pulmonary arteries supply the alveoli of the lungs. In contrast, bronchial arteries, that has different origins, supply the bronchi of the lungs.

== Development ==
The pulmonary arteries originate from the truncus arteriosus and the sixth pharyngeal arch. The truncus arteriosus is a structure that forms during the development of the heart as a successor to the conus arteriosus.

By the third week of development, the endocardial tubes have developed a swelling in the part closest to the heart. The swelling is known as the bulbus cordis and the upper part of this swelling develops into the truncus arteriosus. The structure is ultimately mesodermal in origin. During development of the heart, the heart tissues undergo folding, and the truncus arteriosus is exposed to what will eventually be both the left and right ventricles. As a septum develops between the two ventricles of the heart, two bulges form on either side of the truncus arteriosus. These progressively enlarge until the trunk splits into the aorta and pulmonary arteries. Failure of these processes can lead to pulmonary artery agenesis.

During early development, the ductus arteriosus connects the pulmonary trunk and the aortic arch, allowing blood to bypass the fetus's amniotic fluid-filled non-functioning lungs.Because the fetus develops within the fluid-filled amniotic sac, hence it relies on the placenta for respiratory gas exchange rather than the lungs.

== Function ==
The pulmonary artery carries deoxygenated blood from the right ventricle to the lungs. The blood here passes through capillaries adjacent to alveoli and becomes oxygenated as part of the process of respiration.

In contrast to the pulmonary arteries, the bronchial arteries supply nutrition to the lungs themselves.

=== Pressure ===
The pulmonary artery pressure (PA pressure) is a measure of the blood pressure found in the main pulmonary artery. This is measured by inserting a catheter into the main pulmonary artery. The mean pressure is typically 9–18 mmHg, and the wedge pressure measured in the left atrium may be 6–12 mmHg. The wedge pressure may be elevated in left heart failure, mitral valve stenosis, and other conditions, such as sickle cell disease.

== Clinical significance ==
The pulmonary artery is relevant in a number of clinical states. Pulmonary hypertension is used to describe an increase in the pressure of the pulmonary artery, and may be defined as a mean pulmonary artery pressure of greater than 25 mmHg. A pulmonary artery diameter of more than 29 mm (measured on a CT scan) is often used as an indicator for pulmonary hypertension. In chest X-rays, a diameter of more than 16 mm for the right descending pulmonary artery is also an indicator for pulmonary hypertension. This may occur as a result of heart problems such as heart failure, lung or airway disease such as COPD or scleroderma, or thromboembolic disease such as pulmonary embolism or emboli seen in sickle cell anaemia. Most recently, computational fluid based tools (non-invasive) have been proposed to be at par with the current clinical tests (invasive) of pulmonary hypertension.

Pulmonary embolism refers to an embolus that lodges in the pulmonary circulation. This may arise from a deep venous thrombosis, especially after a period of immobility. A pulmonary embolus is a common cause of death in patients with cancer and stroke. A large pulmonary embolus that becomes lodged in the bifurcation of the pulmonary trunk with extensions into both the left and right main pulmonary arteries is called a saddle embolus.

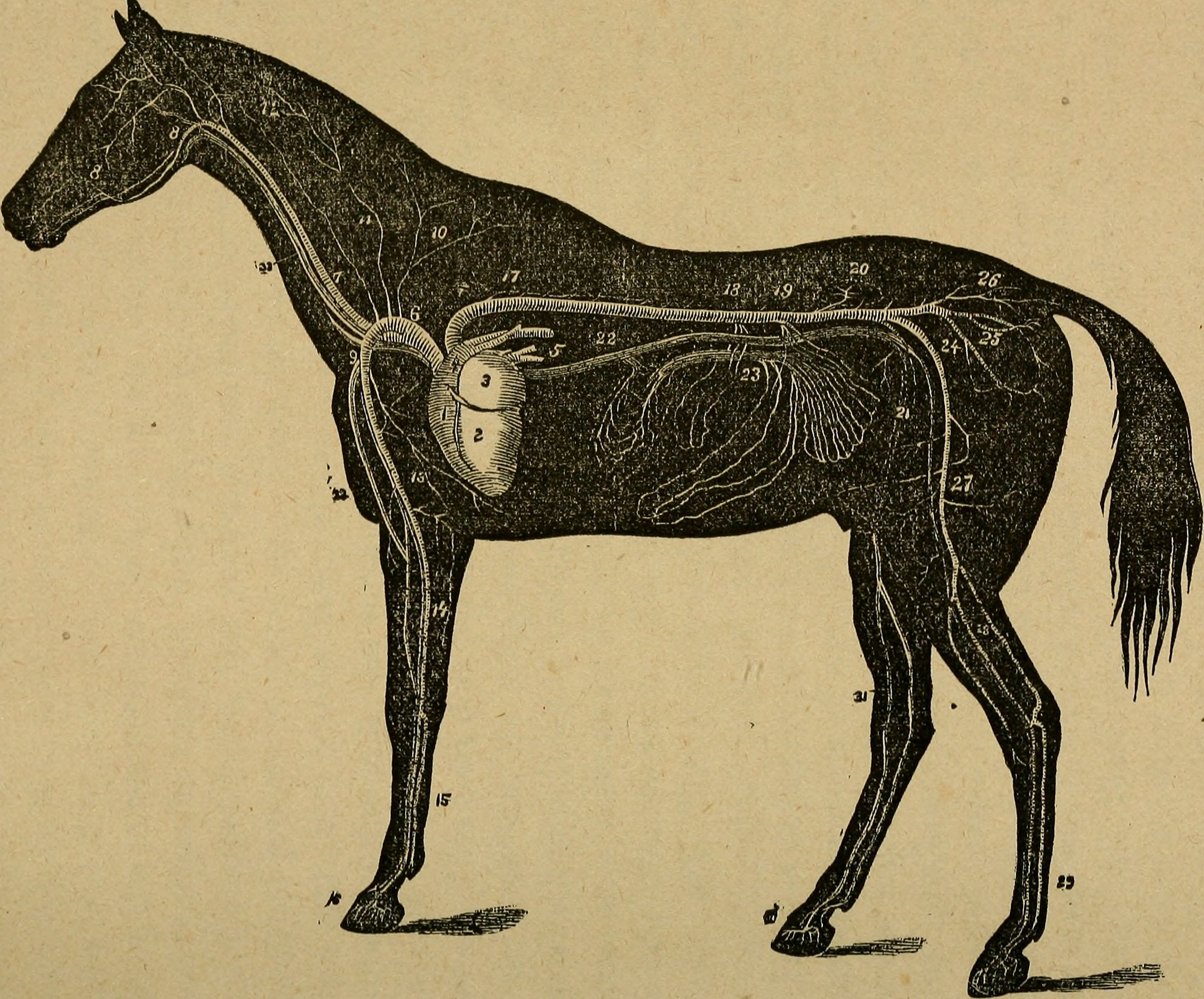
(made in (1883)) Anatomy of the horse, with other arteries: spermatic artery (21), next to (posterior) vena cava, venae portae, External iliac artery, and the mesenteric vessels, Internal iliac and renal arteries labeled. The pulmonary artery and pulmonary veins are labelled (4) and (5), respectively.

Several animal models have been utilized for investigating pulmonary artery related pathologies. Porcine model of pulmonary artery is the most frequently used and it was recently found that their mechanical properties vary with every subsequent branching.

== Additional images ==
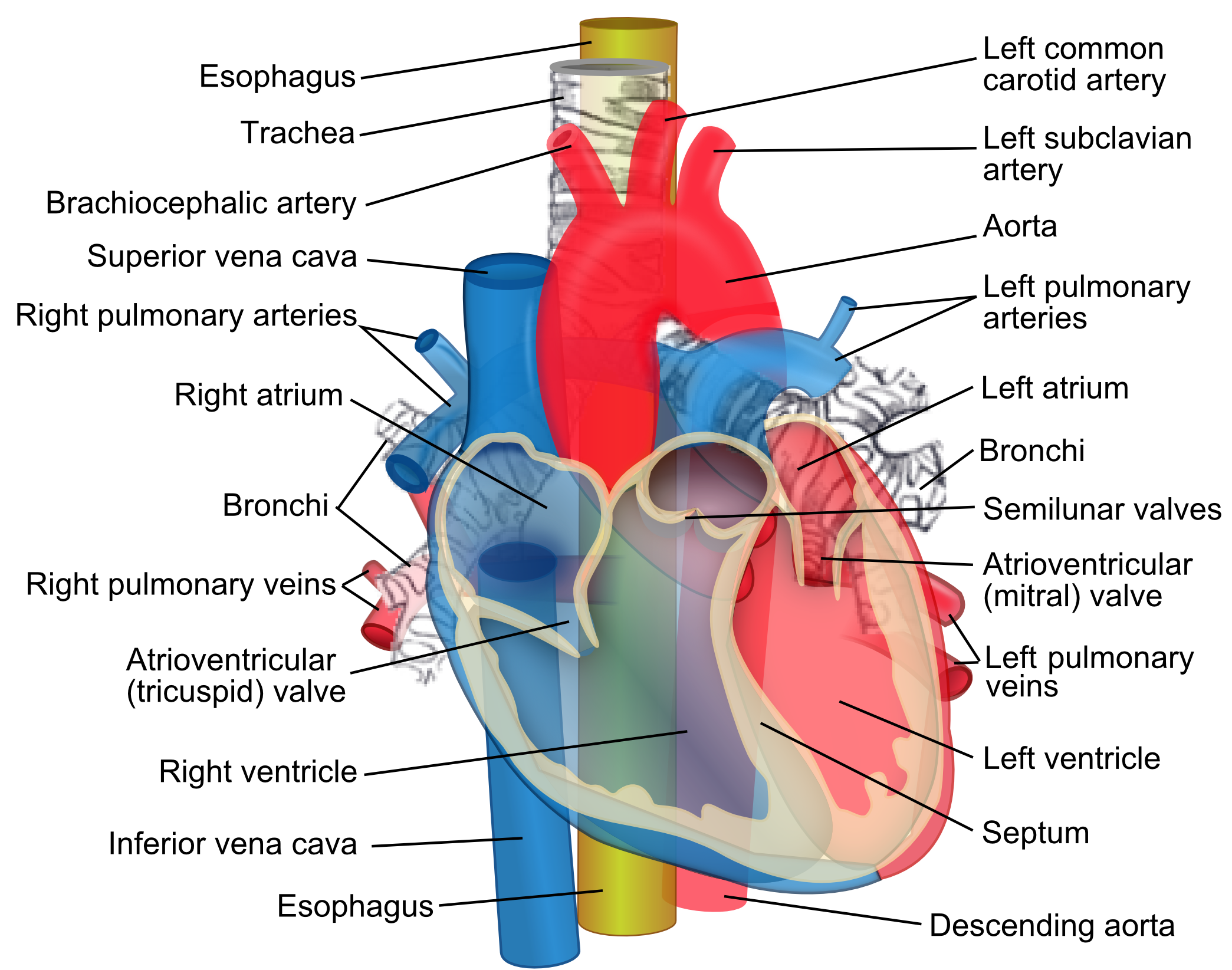
Image showing main pulmonary artery coursing ventrally to the aortic root and trachea, and the right pulmonary artery passes dorsally to the ascending aorta, while the left pulmonary artery passes ventrally to the descending aorta.

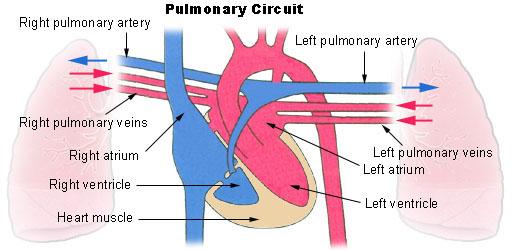
Pulmonary circuit

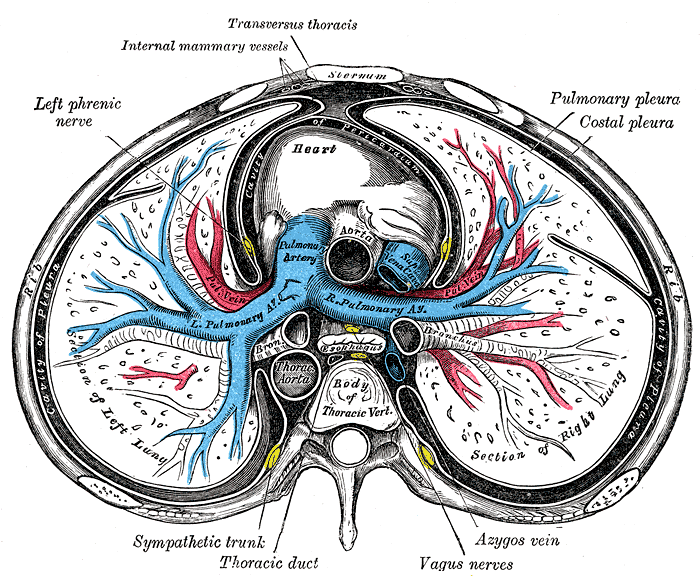
Transverse section of thorax, showing relations of pulmonary artery.

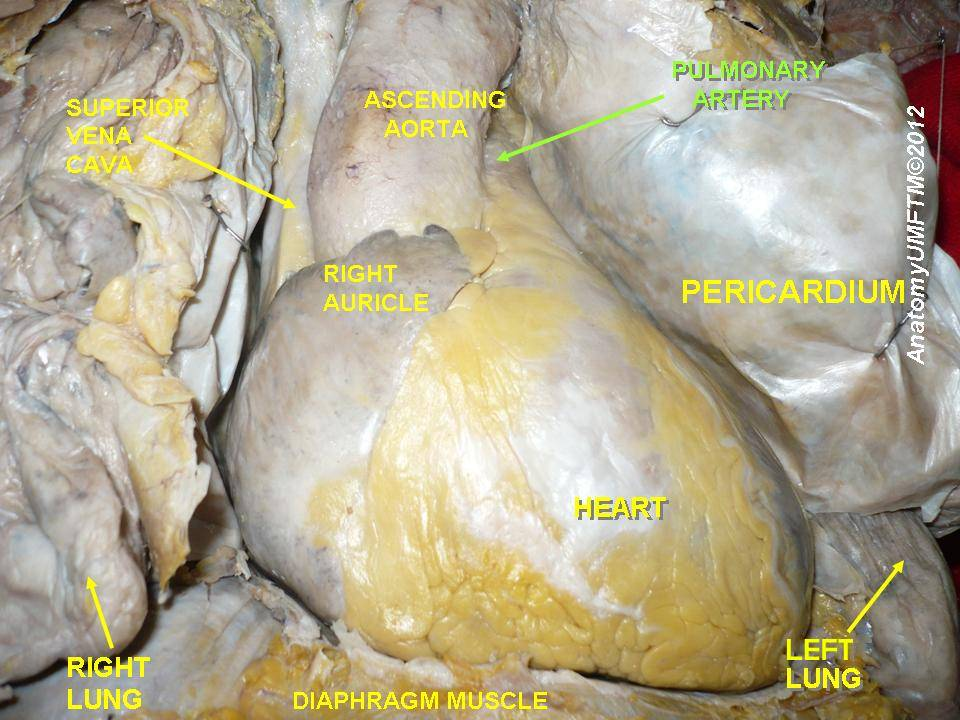
Pulmonary artery

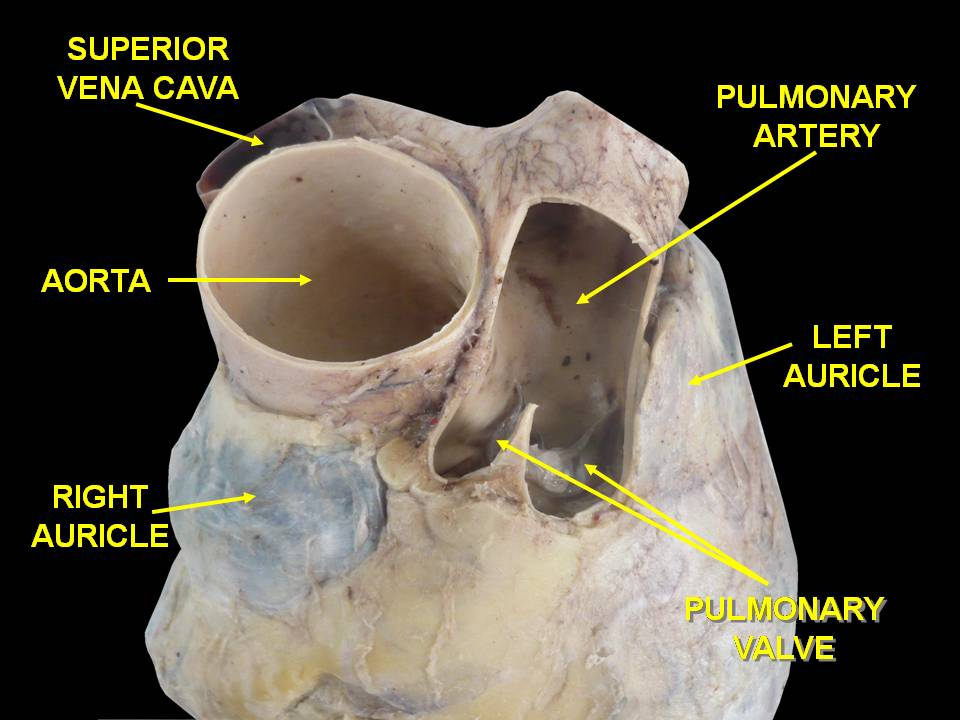
Pulmonary artery.Deep dissection.Anterior view.

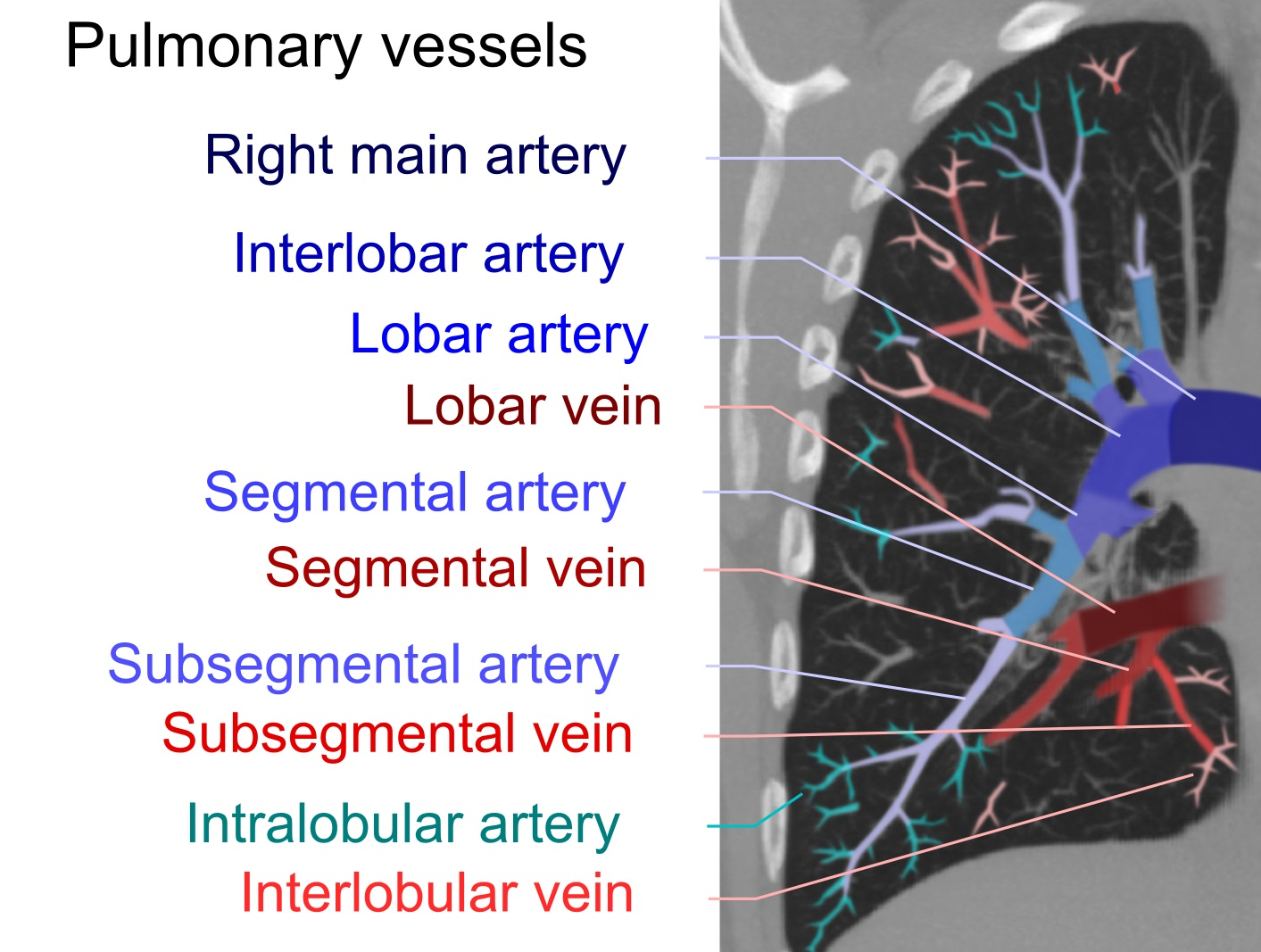
CT scan of a normal lung, with different levels of pulmonary arteries.

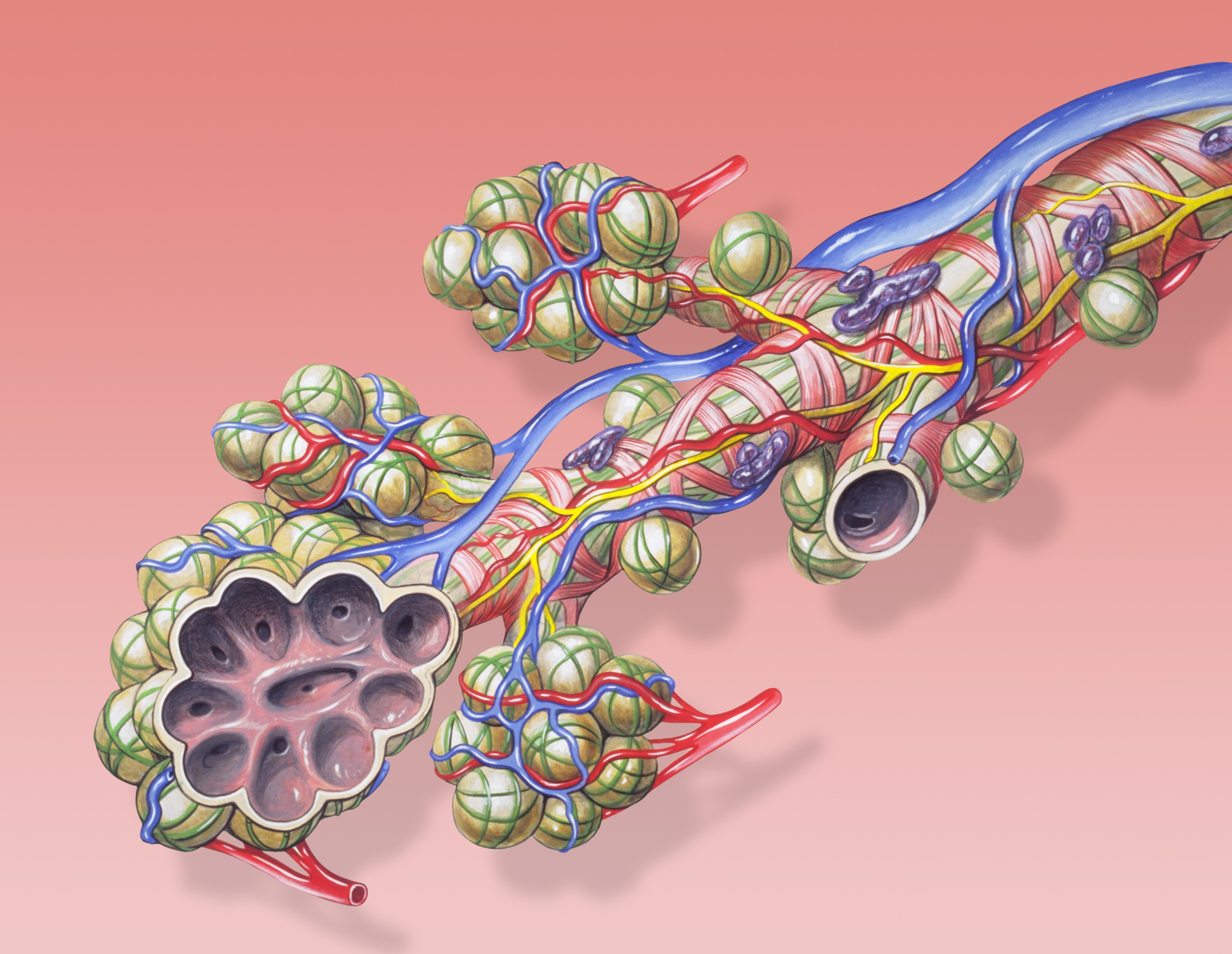
Bronchial anatomy

== See also ==
- Pulmonary artery sling
- Rasmussen's aneurysm
- Pulmonary vein
- Pulmonary circulation
- Bronchial artery
- Bronchial vein
- Brachial artery
- Brachial vein
- Coronary artery
- Coronary sinus
- Left gastric vein (Coronary vein)
- Pulmonary valve
