= Hemoptysis =

Bloody mucus from coughing

- Other names: Haemoptysis, coughing up of blood
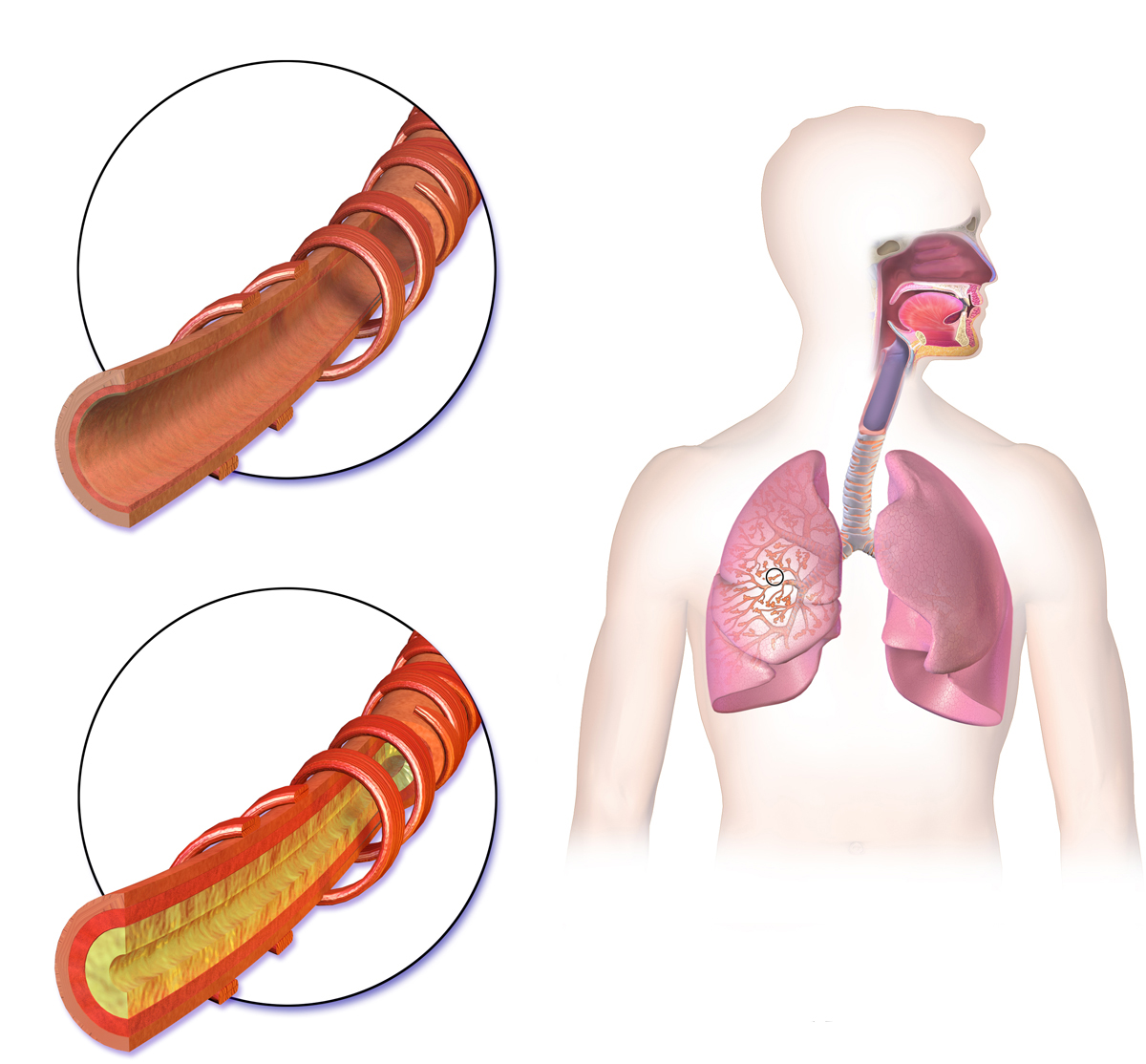
- Lower left: Inflammation of the bronchus can bring about bloody mucus.
- Pronunciation: /hɪˈmɒptɪsɪs/
- Specialty: Pulmonology
- Symptoms: Spitting blood or bloody sputum
- Complications: Pulmonary aspiration, choking
- Causes: bronchitis, lung cancer, certain infections, pulmonary embolism
- Differential diagnosis: epistaxis (combined with post-nasal drip)

Hemoptysis or haemoptysis is the discharge of blood or blood-stained mucus through the mouth coming from the bronchi, larynx, trachea, or lungs. In other words, it is the airway bleeding, and does not necessarily involve coughing. This can occur with lung cancer, infections such as tuberculosis, bronchitis, or pneumonia, and certain cardiovascular conditions. Hemoptysis is considered massive at 300 mL (11 imp fl oz; 10 US fl oz). In such cases, there are always severe injuries. The primary danger comes from choking, rather than blood loss.

== Diagnosis ==
Diagnostic approach to solving the puzzle of hemoptysis.

- Past history, history of present illness, family history
  - history of tuberculosis, bronchiectasis, chronic bronchitis, mitral stenosis, etc.
  - history of cigarette smoking, occupational diseases by exposure to silica dust, etc.
- Blood
  - duration, frequency, amount
  - Amounts of blood: large amounts of blood, or there is blood-streaked sputum
  - Probable source of bleeding: Is the blood coughed up, or vomited?
- Bloody sputum
  - color, characters: blood-streaked, fresh blood, frothy pink, bloody gelatinous.
- Accompanying symptoms
  - fever, chest pain, coughing, purulent sputum, mucocutaneous bleeding, jaundice.
- Imaging examination
  - chest X-ray, CT scan and 3D reconstruction images or CT virtual bronchoscopy, bronchial angiography.
- Laboratory tests
  - blood test: WBC
  - Sputum: cells and bacterial examinations, sputum culture
- Bronchial fiber endoscopy

== Differential diagnosis ==
The most common causes for hemoptysis in adults are chest infections such as bronchitis or pneumonia. In children, hemoptysis is commonly caused by the presence of a foreign body in the airway. Other common causes include lung cancers and tuberculosis. Less common causes include aspergilloma, bronchiectasis, coccidioidomycosis, pulmonary embolism, pneumonic plague, and cystic fibrosis. Rarer causes include hereditary hemorrhagic telangiectasia (HHT or Rendu-Osler-Weber syndrome), Goodpasture's syndrome, and granulomatosis with polyangiitis. A rare cause of hemoptysis in women is endometriosis, which leads to intermittent hemoptysis coinciding with menstrual periods in 7% of women with thoracic endometriosis syndrome. Hemoptysis may be exacerbated or even caused by overtreatment with anticoagulant drugs such as warfarin.

Blood-laced mucus from the sinus or nose area can sometimes be misidentified as symptomatic of hemoptysis (such secretions can be a sign of nasal or sinus cancer, but also a sinus infection). Extensive non-respiratory injury can also cause one to cough up blood. Cardiac causes like congestive heart failure and mitral stenosis should be ruled out. The origin of blood can be identified by observing its color. Bright-red, foamy blood comes from the respiratory tract, whereas dark-red, coffee-colored blood comes from the gastrointestinal tract. Sometimes hemoptysis may be rust-colored.

- Lung cancer, including both non-small cell lung carcinoma and small cell lung carcinoma.
- Sarcoidosis
- Aspergilloma
- Tuberculosis
- Histoplasmosis
- Pneumonia
- Pulmonary edema
- Endometriosis and thoracic endometriosis syndrome
- Foreign body aspiration and aspiration pneumonia
- Goodpasture's syndrome
- Microscopic polyangiitis
- Granulomatosis with polyangiitis
- Eosinophilic granulomatosis with polyangiitis
- Bronchitis
- Bronchiectasis
- Pulmonary embolism
- Anticoagulant use
- Trauma
- Lung abscess
- Mitral stenosis
- Tropical pulmonary eosinophilia
- Bleeding disorders
- Hughes-Stovin syndrome and other variants of Behçet's disease
- Pulmonary arteriovenous malformations

== Massive hemoptysis and mortality ==
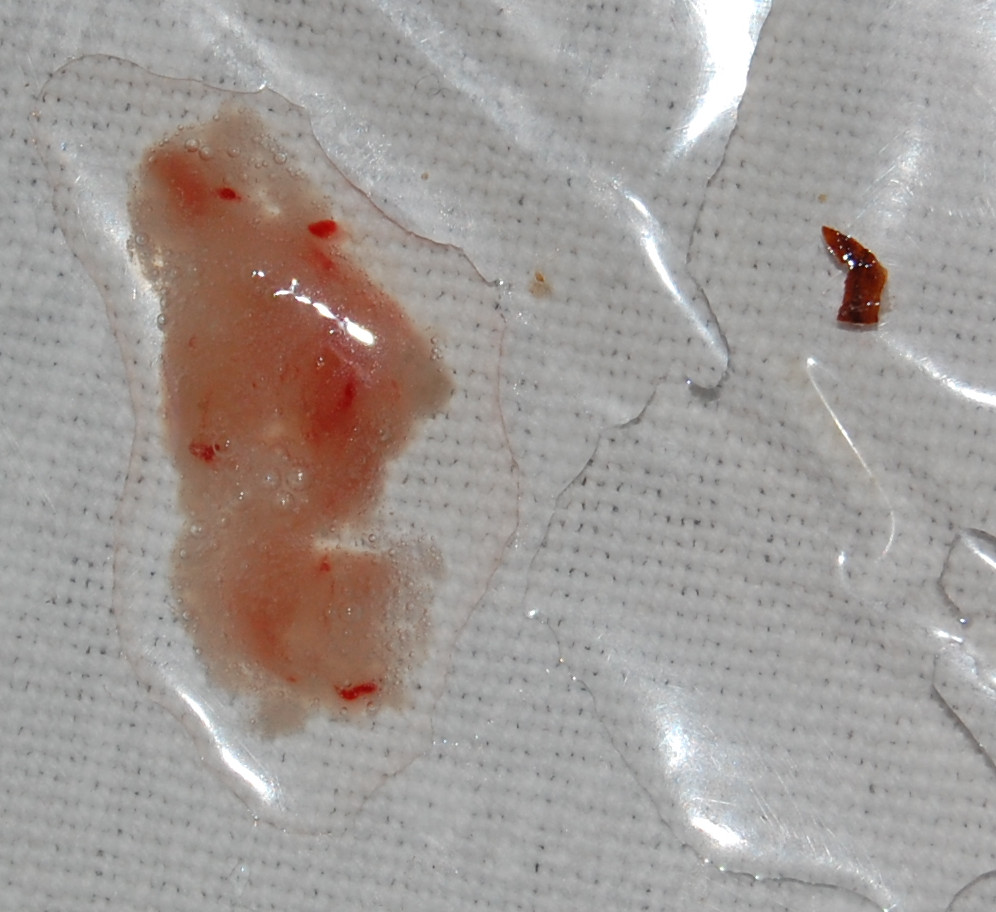
Hemoptysis

Although there are reports that the fatality rate is as high as 80%, the mortality rate for hospitalized hemoptysis patients is 9.4% (with n=28539), calculated from the data in the article by Kinoshita et al. This is probably the most reasonable figure considering the overwhelming number of cases.

The general definition of massive hemoptysis is more than 200 ml within 24 hours, but there is a wide range in the literature (100–600 ml). Considering that the total volume of the tracheal and bronchial lumen is about 150 cc, it may be reasonable to define massive hemoptysis as 200 ml, which is a little more than 150 ml, in terms of setting the threshold for fatal hemoptysis. More than 400ml/day is not adequate for screening purposes.

== Treatment ==
Treatment depends on the underlying cause. Treatments include iced saline, and topical vasoconstrictors such as adrenaline or vasopressin. Tranexamic acid was proved to improve in-hospital mortality. Selective bronchial intubation can be used to collapse the lung that is bleeding. Also, endobronchial tamponade can be used. Laser photocoagulation can be used to stop bleeding during bronchoscopy. Angiography of bronchial arteries can be performed to locate the bleeding, and it can often be embolized. Bronchial artery embolization (BAE) is the first line treatment nowadays. Surgical option is usually the last resort and can involve removal of a lung lobe or removal of the entire lung. Cough suppressants can increase the risk of choking.
