= Copeville, Texas =

- Unincorporated community
- Location within the state of Texas Copeville (the United States)
- Coordinates: 33°4′46″N 96°24′56″W
- Country: United States
- State: Texas
- County: Collin
- Elevation: 554 ft (169 m)
- Time zone: UTC−6 (Central (CST))
  - Summer (DST): UTC−5 (CDT)
- ZIP Codes: 75121
- Area codes: 214, 469, 945, 972
- FIPS code: 48-16600
- GNIS feature ID: 1333321

Copeville is an unincorporated community in Collin County, Texas, United States. According to the Handbook of Texas, the community had a population of 106 in 2000. It is located in the Dallas-Fort Worth Metroplex.

== History ==
Copeville was named for Miles Cope, one of the first people to settle in the area, and was initially located one mile west of the current townsite. In the 1850s, Cope organized the community alongside his father and brother. Thomas King plotted and surveyed the Copeville townsite in 1877. A post office was created the next year. The town featured a sawmill, a flour mill, a church, a cotton gin, and a general shop by 1885. One mile east of Copeville, the Gulf, Colorado, and Santa Fe Railroad constructed track in 1886. Soon after, locals relocated their homes and businesses to the train line to benefit from it. Up to the 1930s, Copeville was used as a shipping hub by local farmers. Dallas received much of its bois d'arc timber from the town between 1885 and 1890, when it was tested out as pavement material. Copeville's population may have reached 300 in 1915. However, the community's expansion was slowed by the Great Depression, farm mechanization, and the employment options available in the Dallas metropolitan region. The population estimate had dropped to 240 in 1926 and stayed that way in the 1920s and 1930s. In 1943, the additional decrease was to 150; this estimate did not change until the early 1970s. Five businesses and two churches were in the town in 1947. Copeville had seven enterprises and 106 persons between 1986 and 1990. In 2000, the population did not change. The population increased to 243 in 2010.

On October 4, 1959, an F3 tornado struck Copeville. On the day after Christmas in 2015, an EF2 tornado struck Copeville. A gas station and convenience store were completely destroyed, killing two people inside. A large garage structure was destroyed, and over 30 homes and businesses in the area were damaged, some severely; 119 people were injured.

== Geography ==
Copeville is on Texas State Highway 78 near the eastern shore of Lavon Lake, 8 mi (13 km) southwest of Farmersville, 21 mi (34 km) southeast of McKinney, and 35 mi (56 km) northeast of Dallas in southeastern Collin County. It is also on Farm to Market Road 1778 on the Collin County Outer Loop.

== Education ==
Copeville had its own school in 1885 and 1947. The community of Copeville is now served by the Community Independent School District. It is zoned for McClendon Elementary School, Leland E. Edge Middle School, and Community High School.

== Notable people ==
- Aubrey Otis Hampton, radiologist who described Hampton's hump and Hampton's line
- J. Weldon Jones, acting High Commissioner to the Philippines
- Charlie Walker, country musician, member of the Grand Ole Opry
- Charles "Tex" Watson, convicted spree killer and former member of the Manson family
