= Millwood, Texas =

- Unincorporated community
- Location within Texas Location within the United States
- Coordinates: 32°59′45″N 96°25′06″W
- Country: United States
- State: Texas
- County: Collin
- Elevation: 505 ft (154 m)
- Time zone: UTC-6 (Central (CST))
  - Summer (DST): UTC-5 (CDT)
- GNIS feature ID: 1378686

Millwood is an unincorporated community in Collin County, located in the U.S. state of Texas. According to the Handbook of Texas, the community had a population of 10 in 1986. It is located within the Dallas-Fort Worth Metroplex.

== History ==
The hamlet was founded during the California gold rush when travelers from Texas to California were struck with gold fever. Texas had few trading establishments and well-established highways, so the forty-niners bought things wherever possible. The owner of the land where Millwood was later built, Drury Anglin, opened a general store on his farm in response to the growing number of people stopping by to get supplies and food. After a few years, a hamlet was established and given the name Millwood due to a lumber mill that was close to Anglin's property. A post office was founded on May 21, 1851. A church, a flour mill, a gristmill, and a cotton gin were among the businesses in Millwood by 1885 when the town had 100 residents. Nonetheless, the town never again attained the 1885 population level. The St. Louis Southwestern Railway bypassed Millwood, making it impossible to compete with the business and transportation amenities at Wylie, which was close. The mail to Millwood was stopped on December 14, 1907, and was instead sent to Royse City. The number of people living in Millwood decreased throughout the following 30 years. Ten people and one business were present in the village in 1940. These numbers held steady in 1986.

== Geography ==
Millwood is located on the east fork of the Trinity River, 10 mi (16 km) east of Wylie and 4 mi (6.4 km) northwest of Royse City in southeastern Collin County.

== Education ==
Millwood had its own school in 1885. Today the community is served by the Community Independent School District. It is zoned for McClendon Elementary School, Leland E. Edge Middle School, and Community High School.
