= Community High School (Texas) =

School in Nevada, Texas, United States

Location
- 440 North Farm-to-Market (FM) 1138; Nevada, Collin County, Texas 75173-0400; United States; 33.0555111°N 96.363842°W

Information
- Type: Co-Educational, Public, Secondary
- Established: 1948
- School district: Community Independent School District
- Superintendent: Dr. Tonya Knowlton
- Principal: Robert Goff
- Teaching staff: 70.64 (FTE)
- Grades: 9-12
- Enrollment: 1,182 (2023–2024)
- Student to teacher ratio: 16.73
- Colors: Royal Blue, Gold & White
- Athletics conference: UIL Class 5A
- Mascot: Braves/Lady Braves
- Website: Community High School

Community High School is a public high school located approximately one mile (1.6 km) north of Nevada, Texas (USA). It is part of the Community Independent School District which covers much of southeastern Collin County and is classified as a 5A school by the University Interscholastic League. The district was a consolidation of schools in Nevada, Josephine, Copeville, and Lavon completed in 1948. In 2022, the school received a rating of "B" from the Texas Education Agency.

== Athletics ==
The school mascot is the Braves/Lady Braves. The mascot name, Lacone Jo, was selected in a 1986 student contest, and is taken from the first two letters of the towns within the district (LAvon, COpeville. NEvada, and JOsephine).

Community High School participates in the following sports:

- Baseball
- Basketball
- Cross Country
- Football
- Golf
- Powerlifting
- Soccer
- Softball
- Tennis
- Track and Field
- Volleyball

=== Drill Team ===
The Dazzlin' Dames drill team performs during half time at football games and also attend competitions. At their most recent competition, they received a total of 8 awards. They are directed by Aili Fenton.

=== Baseball ===
In 2015, the Varsity baseball team under the direction of Head Coach David Allen, returned the winning pride to Community ISD. Finishing second in district play and capturing a Bi-District Title.

=== Speech, Theatre and Debate ===
Community High School also has a Speech, Theatre and Debate program. The program regularly participates in UIL tournaments. In December 2011, they hosted their 1st UIL tournament at Community.

=== Band ===
Community High School has a band program.
