= Westermark =

Westermark is a Swedish surname. Notable people with the surname include:

- August Westermark (1834–1894), Finnish-Swedish stage actor
- Axel Westermark (1875–1911), American sailor
- Daniel Westermark (b. 1963), Swedish professional golfer
- Herbert Westermark (1891–1981), Swedish sailor
- Jesper Westermark (b. 1993), Swedish footballer
- Lennart Westermark (b. 1965), Swedish bobsledder
- Nils Westermark (1892–1980), Swedish sailor and radiologist
- Ulla Westermark (1927–2020), Swedish numismatist

== See also ==
- Westermark sign, in chest radiography
- Edvard Westermarck (1862–1939), Finnish philosopher and sociologist
  - Westermarck effect
