= Nevada, Texas =

- City
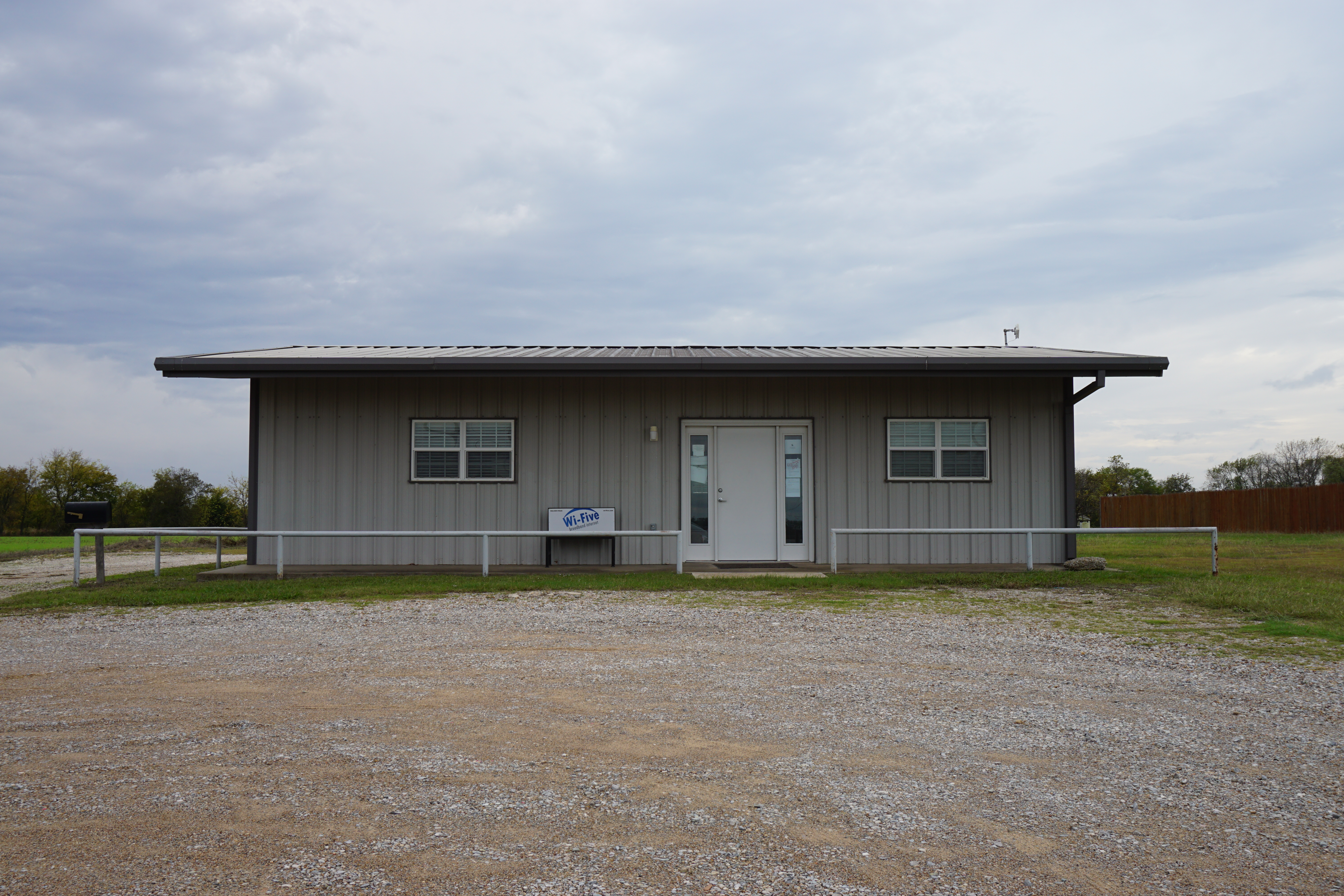
- Nevada City Hall

- Location of Nevada in Collin County, Texas
- Coordinates: 33°02′28″N 96°22′43″W
- Country: United States
- State: Texas
- County: Collin

Area
  - Total: 2.40 sq mi (6.21 km^{2})
  - Land: 2.39 sq mi (6.18 km^{2})
  - Water: 0.012 sq mi (0.03 km^{2})
- Elevation: 623 ft (190 m)

Population (2020)
  - Total: 1,314
  - Density: 551/sq mi (213/km^{2})
- Time zone: UTC-6 (Central (CST))
  - Summer (DST): UTC-5 (CDT)
- ZIP code: 75173
- Area codes: 214, 469, 945, 972
- FIPS code: 48-50760
- GNIS feature ID: 2411224
- Website: cityofnevadatx.org

Nevada (/nɪˈveɪdə/ niv-AY-də, unlike the state of Nevada) is a city in Collin County, Texas, United States. Its population was 822 at the 2010 census and 1,314 in 2020.

== History ==
The first settlement in the area, by John McMinn in the 1840s, was McMinn Chapel, populated mostly by his family and friends. In 1861, Granville Stinebaugh purchased a quarter-section four miles south and established the town on his farm and named it in honor of Nevada Territory, through which he had passed on his way to search California. Nevada enjoyed some prosperity after becoming a stop on the St. Louis Southwestern Railway, and the town incorporated in 1889.

On May 9, 1927, a half-mile-wide F4 tornado ripped through Nevada, leaving 19 dead, 100 injured, and property damage exceeding $650,000. The town had a difficult recovery; citizens voted to unincorporate, and placed the restoration of the community in the hands of the Collin County authorities, but the growing mechanization in agriculture, along with the Great Depression, caused the town to decline. The railroad later removed its tracks from the area. Growth in Collin County during the last 25 years has moderately improved life in Nevada. The population has again reached its 1927 peak.

== Geography ==
Nevada is located in southeastern Collin County, 4 miles (6 km) east of Lavon and 4 miles west of Josephine. It is 20 miles (32 km) northeast of Garland and 36 miles (58 km) northeast of downtown Dallas.

According to the United States Census Bureau, the city of Nevada has a total area of 2.4 square miles (6.2 km^{2}), of which 0.01 square miles (0.03 km^{2}), or 0.52% - 19 acres, is covered by water.

== Demographics ==
Historical population
Census	Pop.	Note	%±
1890	247		—
1900	356		44.1%
1910	510		43.3%
1920	578		13.3%
1930	386		−33.2%
1990	456		—
2000	563		23.5%
2010	822		46.0%
2020	1,314		59.9%
2023 (est.)	1,419		8.0%
U.S. Decennial Census

=== 2020 census ===
As of the 2020 census, Nevada had a population of 1,314. The median age was 40.5 years, 24.5% of residents were under the age of 18, and 14.8% were 65 years of age or older. For every 100 females there were 105.3 males, and for every 100 females age 18 and over there were 105.8 males age 18 and over.

0.0% of residents lived in urban areas, while 100.0% lived in rural areas.

There were 441 households in Nevada, of which 41.0% had children under the age of 18 living in them. Of all households, 73.5% were married-couple households, 9.1% were households with a male householder and no spouse or partner present, and 12.0% were households with a female householder and no spouse or partner present. About 11.3% of all households were made up of individuals and 6.1% had someone living alone who was 65 years of age or older.

There were 467 housing units, of which 5.6% were vacant. The homeowner vacancy rate was 0.7% and the rental vacancy rate was 17.1%.

Racial composition as of the 2020 census
Race	Number	Percent
White	1,061	80.7%
Black or African American	35	2.7%
American Indian and Alaska Native	13	1.0%
Asian	14	1.1%
Native Hawaiian and Other Pacific Islander	3	0.2%
Some other race	72	5.5%
Two or more races	116	8.8%
Hispanic or Latino (of any race)	184	14.0%

Nevada racial composition (NH = Non-Hispanic) (Note: Note: the US Census treats Hispanic/Latino as an ethnic category. This table excludes Latinos from the racial categories and assigns them to a separate category. Hispanics/Latinos can be of any race.)
Race	Number	Percentage
White (NH)	1,020	77.63%
Black or African American (NH)	35	2.66%
Native American or Alaska Native (NH)	11	0.84%
Asian (NH)	14	1.07%
Pacific Islander (NH)	3	0.23%
Some other race (NH)	2	0.15%
Mixed or multiracial (NH)	45	3.42%
Hispanic or Latino	184	14.0%
Total	1,314	

== Education ==
The city is served by the Community Independent School District.
