= Right heart strain =

Deformation of the right ventricle of the heart

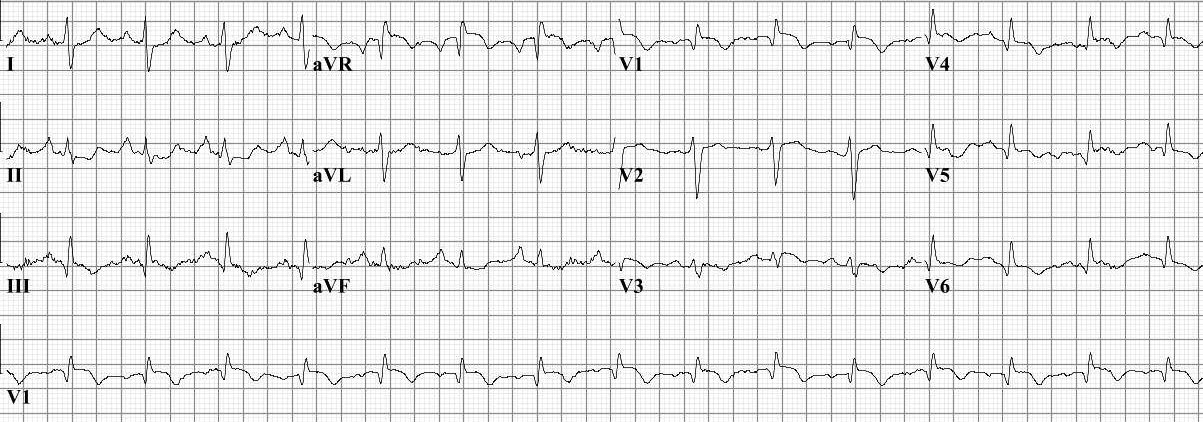
Electrocardiogram of a person with pulmonary embolism, showing sinus tachycardia of approximately 100 beats per minute, large S wave in Lead I, moderate Q wave in Lead III, inverted T wave in Lead III, and inverted T waves in leads V1 and V3.

Right heart strain (also right ventricular strain or RV strain) is a medical finding of right ventricular dysfunction where the heart muscle of the right ventricle (RV) is deformed. Right heart strain can be caused by pulmonary hypertension, pulmonary embolism (or PE, which itself can cause pulmonary hypertension), RV infarction (a heart attack affecting the RV), chronic lung disease (such as pulmonary fibrosis), pulmonic stenosis, bronchospasm, and pneumothorax.

When using an echocardiograph (echo) to visualize the heart, (Note: The apical-four-chamber (A4C) view is best to visualize right heart strain by echo.) strain can appear with the RV being enlarged and more round than typical. When normal, the RV is about half the size of the left ventricle (LV). When strained, it can be as large as or larger than the LV. An important potential finding with echo is McConnell's sign, where only the RV apex wall contracts; it is specific for right heart strain and typically indicates a large PE.

On an electrocardiogram (ECG), there are multiple ways RV strain can be demonstrated. A finding of S1Q3T3 (Note: Indicative of a prominent S wave in lead I, a Q wave in lead III, and an inverted T wave in lead III, which is also known as the McGinn–White sign) is an insensitive sign of right heart strain. It is non-specific (as it does not indicate a cause) and is present in a minority of PE cases. It can also result from acute changes associated with bronchospasm and pneumothorax. Other EKG signs include a right bundle branch block as well as T wave inversions in the anterior leads, which are "thought to be the consequence of an ischemic phenomenon due to low cardiac output in the context of RV dilation and strain." Aside from echo and ECG, RV strain is visible with a CT scan of the chest and via cardiac magnetic resonance.

== See also ==
- Pulmonary heart disease (cor pulmonale)
- Right heart failure
- Hampton hump
