= Bilharzial cor pulmonale =

- Specialty: Cardiology, parasitology

Bilharzial cor pulmonale is the condition of right sided heart failure secondary to fibrosis and sclerosis of the pulmonary artery branches. It results from shifting of the Schistosoma haematobium ova from the pelvic and vesical plexus to the pulmonary artery branches where they settle and produce granuloma and fibrosis. This was identified by Theodor Bilharz, a German surgeon working in Cairo in 1851.

This condition leads to pulmonary hypertension, right ventricular hypertrophy and failure.

== See also ==
- Cor pulmonale.
