= Geneva score =

- Purpose: pre-test probability of Venous Thrombo Embolism =

The Geneva score is a clinical prediction rule used in determining the pre-test probability of pulmonary embolism (PE) based on a patient's risk factors and clinical findings. It has been shown to be as accurate as the Wells Score, and is less reliant on the experience of the doctor applying the rule. The Geneva score has been revised and simplified from its original version. The simplified Geneva score is the newest version for the general population, and predicted to have the same diagnostic utility as the original Geneva score. A version of the revised score was modified to be applicable to pregnant patients.

== Original Geneva Score ==
The original Geneva score was developed in 2001 in Geneva, Switzerland.

It's calculated using 7 risk factors and clinical variables:

Variable	Score
Age
60–79 years	1
80+ years	2
Previous venous thromboembolism
Previous DVT or PE	2
Previous surgery
Recent surgery within 4 weeks	3
Heart rate
Heart rate >100 beats per minute	1
PaCO_{2} (partial pressure of CO_{2} in arterial blood)
<35mmHg	2
35-39mmHg	1
PaO_{2} (partial pressure of O_{2} in arterial blood)
<49mmHg	4
49-59mmHg	3
60-71mmHg	2
72-82mmHg	1
Chest X-ray findings
Band atelectasis	1
Elevation of hemidiaphragm	1

The score obtained relates to the probability of the patient having had a pulmonary embolism (the lower the score, the lower the probability):

- <5 points indicates a low probability of PE (10%)
- 5 - 8 points indicates a moderate probability of PE ( 38%)
- >8 points indicates a high probability of PE. (81%)

== Revised Geneva Score ==
In 2006 the revised Geneva score was introduced. This simplifies the scoring process, and has also been shown to be as effective as the Wells score.

The revised score uses 8 parameters, but does not include figures which require an arterial blood gas sample to be performed:

Variable	Score
Age 65 years or over	1
Previous DVT or PE	3
Surgery or fracture within 1 month	2
Active malignant condition	2
Unilateral lower limb pain	3
Hemoptysis	2
Heart rate 75 to 94 beats per minute	3
Heart rate 95 or more beats per minute	5
Pain on deep palpation of lower limb and unilateral edema	4

The score obtained relates to probability of PE:

- 0 - 3 points indicates low probability (8%)
- 4 - 10 points indicates intermediate probability (29%)
- 11 points or more indicates high probability (74%)

The probabilities derived from the scoring systems can be used to determine the need for, and nature of, further investigations such as D-dimer, ventilation/perfusion scanning and CT pulmonary angiography to confirm or refute the diagnosis of PE.

== Simplified Geneva Score ==
A newer revision referred to as the simplified revised Geneva score has been prospectively studied and reported in the Archives of Internal Medicine on October 27 of 2008. The simplified scoring system replaced the weighted scores for each parameter with a 1-point score for each parameter present to reduce the likelihood of error when the score is used in a clinical setting. The report noted that the simplified Geneva score does not lead to a decrease in diagnostic utility in evaluating patients for a PE when compared to previous Geneva scores.

The simplified Geneva score:

Variable	Score
Age >65	1
Previous DVT or PE	1
Surgery or fracture within 1 month	1
Active malignancy	1
Unilateral lower limb pain	1
Hemoptysis	1
Pain on deep vein palpation of lower limb and unilateral edema	1
Heart rate 75 to 94 bpm	1
Heart rate greater than 94 bpm	2

Patients with a score of 2 or less are considered unlikely to have a current PE. Authors suggest that the likelihood of patients having a PE with a simplified Geneva score less than 2 and a normal D-Dimer is 3 percent.

== Pregnancy Adapted Geneva (PAG) ==
In 2021, the items of the Revised Geneva Score were re-evaluated on pregnant women. Some items were removed, and the threshold values for the remaining items were modified to better discriminate patients even with the altered physiologic baseline of pregnancy (e.g. higher cut-off value for heart rate, lower cut-off value for age). The ROC for the resulting score had an AUC of 0.795 (CI 0.690–0.899) according to the authors, which is similar to (and even better than) the Revised Geneva Score. It's important to note, that this AUC was measured in the pregnant population, and the score was not generalized to include pregnant patients, but modified for the characteristics of pregnant patients. It's not tested on non-pregnant patients.

Patients are categorized in 3 pre-test probability groups:

- 0-1 points: low risk ( <10% risk of PE)
- 2-6 points: intermediate risk ( 10-50% risk of PE)
- >6 points: high risk ( >50% risk of PE

Pregnancy Adapted Geneva score
Variable (modified items from Revised Geneva score in bold)	Score
**Age 40 (~~65)~~ years or over**	1
Previous DVT or PE	3
Surgery or lower limb fracture within 1 month	2
~~**Active malignant condition**~~	~~2~~
Unilateral lower limb pain	3
Hemoptysis	2
~~**Heart rate 75 to 94 beats per minute**~~	~~3~~
**Heart rate 110 (~~95)~~ or more beats per minute**	5
Pain on deep palpation of lower limb and unilateral edema	4
