= Aubrey Otis Hampton =

American physician

Aubrey Otis Hampton (September 10, 1900, in Copeville, Texas – July 17, 1955, in Weare, New Hampshire) was an American radiologist remembered for describing Hampton's hump and Hampton's line. He graduated from Baylor College of Medicine in 1925, undertook his internship in Dallas and worked at the Massachusetts General Hospital from 1926. He became chief of radiology at Massachusetts General in 1941, serving as chief of radiology at the Walter Reed Army Hospital in Washington, D.C. from 1942 to 1945. Hampton was said to be one of the most accurate radiologists in diagnosing during his era.

Hampton died in 1955, aged 54, and is buried in the Hillside Cemetery, in Weare, New Hampshire.

== Sources ==
- Wonders of Radiology p. 62-65
