= CT pulmonary angiogram =

Medical imaging of blood flow between heart and lungs

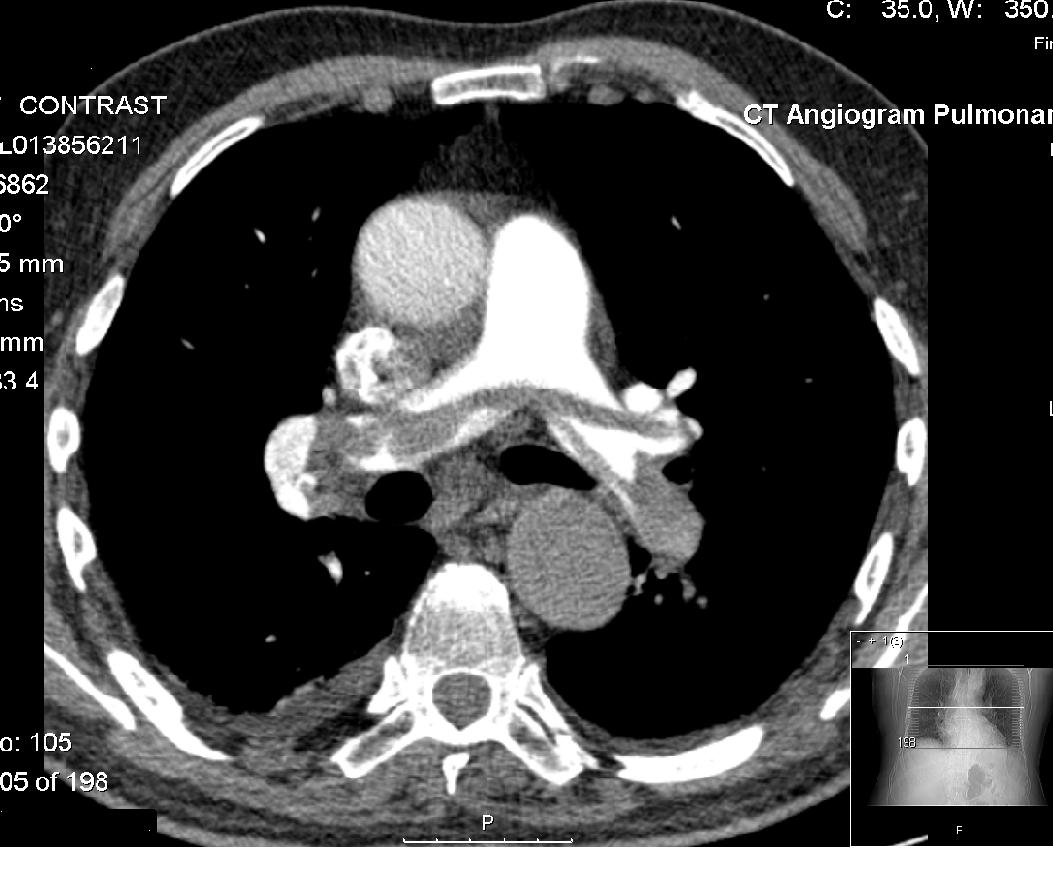
- Example of a CTPA, demonstrating a saddle embolus. The white area above the center is the pulmonary artery, opacified by radiocontrast. Inside it, the grey matter is blood clot. The black areas on either side are the lungs, with around it the chest wall.
- OPS-301 code: 3-222

A CT pulmonary angiogram (CTPA) is a medical diagnostic test that employs computed tomography (CT) angiography to obtain an image of the pulmonary arteries. Its main use is to diagnose pulmonary embolism (PE). It is a preferred choice of imaging in the diagnosis of PE due to its minimally invasive nature for the patient, whose only requirement for the scan is an intravenous line.

Modern MDCT (multi-detector CT) scanners are able to deliver images of sufficient resolution within a short time period, such that CTPA has now supplanted previous methods of testing, such as direct pulmonary angiography, as the gold standard for diagnosis of pulmonary embolism.

The patient receives an intravenous injection of an iodine-containing contrast agent at a high rate using an injector pump. Images are acquired with the maximum intensity of radio-opaque contrast in the pulmonary arteries. This can be done using bolus tracking.

A normal CTPA scan will show the contrast filling the pulmonary vessels, appearing as bright white. Any mass filling defects, such as an embolus, will appear dark in place of the contrast, filling/blocking the space where blood should be flowing into the lungs.

== Diagnostic use ==
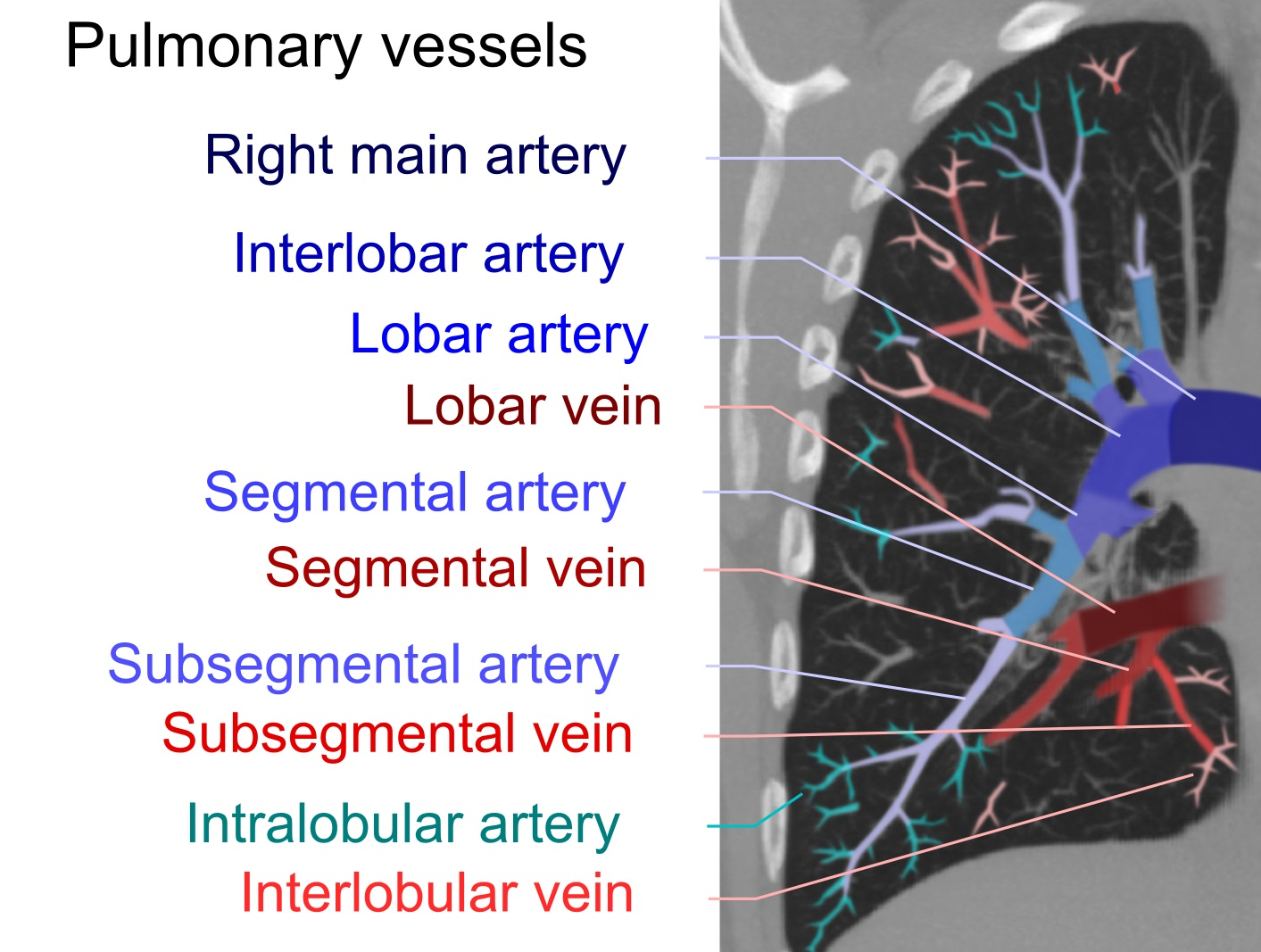
Pulmonary emboli can be classified according to level along the pulmonary arterial tree.

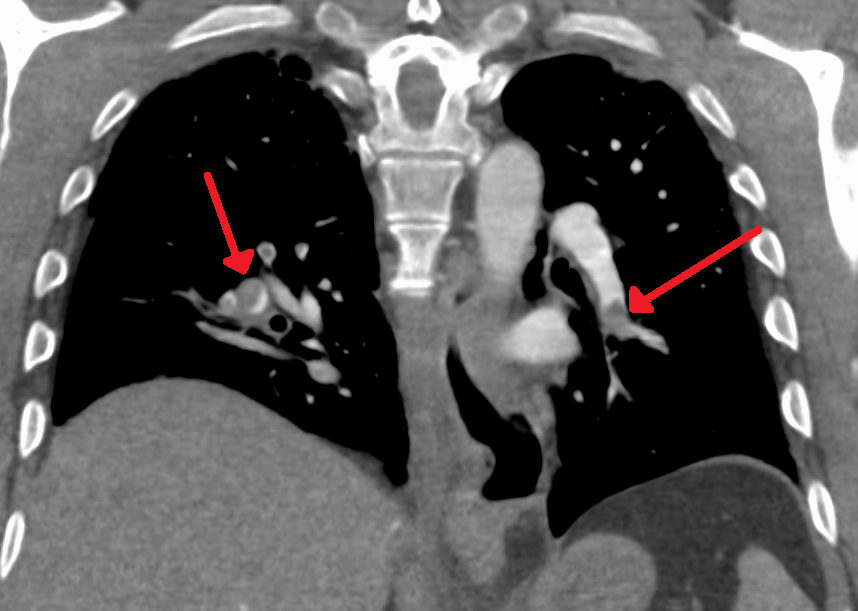
CT pulmonary angiogram showing segmental and subsegmental pulmonary emboli on both sides.

CTPA was introduced in the 1990s as an alternative to ventilation/perfusion scanning (V/Q scan), which relies on radionuclide imaging of the blood vessels of the lung. It is regarded as a highly sensitive and specific test for pulmonary embolism.

CTPA is typically only requested if pulmonary embolism is suspected clinically. If the probability of PE is considered low, a blood test called D-dimer may be requested. If this is negative and risk of a PE is considered negligible, then CTPA or other scans are generally not performed. Most patients will have undergone a chest X-ray before CTPA is requested.

After initial concern that CTPA would miss smaller emboli, a 2007 study comparing CTPA directly with V/Q scanning found that CTPA identified more emboli without increasing the risk of long-term complications compared to V/Q scanning. A V/Q scan may still be recommended when a lower radiation dose is required.

On CTPA, acute emboli have been found at radiodensities ranging between about 5 and 65 Hounsfield units (HU), while chronic emboli have ranged between about 30 and 150.

== Contraindications ==
CTPA is less desirable in pregnancy due to the amount of ionizing radiation required, which may damage the breasts, which are particularly sensitive during pregnancy, and because of concerns of the effects of iodine on the fetus' thyroid gland. V/Q scans can offer lower radiation doses, and may be adapted to further reduce the dose by omitting the lung ventilation portion of the exam. They are therefore recommended to be preferentially applied to pregnant patients. Diagnostic algorithms for pulmonary embolism in pregnancy vary; however, a common compromise is to perform ultrasound testing for deep vein thrombosis of the legs, and if this is positive, make the diagnosis of pulmonary embolism on the basis of symptoms and presence of the DVT. CTPA would then only be performed if exhaustive non-radiation based testing could not make a positive diagnosis.

CTPA is contraindicated in known or suspected allergy to contrast media or in kidney failure (where contrast agents could worsen the kidney function).

== Acquisition ==
The best results are obtained using multidetector computed tomography (MDCT) scanners.

An intravenous cannula is required for the administration of iodinated contrast. The typical dose is 30-40 g of iodine (corresponding to 20–30 cc of 370 mg/ml iodine solution). However, for patients at high risk of contrast-induced nephropathy, it is possible to reduce the required amount of contrast using dual energy CT. With such a protocol, only 7–10 g of iodine (20–30 cc of 370 mg/ml iodine solution) may be needed. Many hospitals use bolus tracking, where the scan commences when the contrast is detected at the level of the proximal pulmonary arteries. If this is done manually, scanning commences about 10–12 seconds after the injection has started. Slices of 1–3 mm. are performed at 1–3 mm. intervals, depending on the nature of the scanner (single- versus multidetector).

High contrast flow rate of 4ml/sec through 18G branula at antecubital fossa is recommended to achieve optimal quality images. However, for those with peripheral arterial disease and those with central venous catheter with low flow rate, 2.0 to 2.5 ml/sec are still manage to produce acceptable images.

State of the art modern CT scanners with a scan rate of up to 320 mm/s can acquire all the images within a 1-second X-ray exposure, avoiding the problems of respiratory motion, cardiac motion and contrast draining from the pulmonary circulation during the study. Even though the actual scan may be completed in 1 second or less, considerable staff and patient time is required for preparation of the contrast agent, positioning on the scanner and planning the scan. This is particularly the case, as patients undergoing CTPA are frequently seriously unwell requiring oxygen treatment and/or close monitoring.

== Interpretation ==
On CTPA, the pulmonary vessels are filled with contrast, and appear white. Any mass filling defects (embolus or other matter such as fat) appears darker. Ideally, the scan should be complete before the contrast reaches the left side of the heart and the aorta, as this may mean contrast has drained from the pulmonary arteries, or require a larger dose of contrast media.

Other from assessing any filing defect within the pulmonary trunk and its segmental branches, the diameter of the right heart can be compared with diameter of the left heart. The right heart diameter should not be more than the diameter of left heart. Normally, the interventricular septum should mildly bulge into the right ventricle due to high pressure within the left ventricle. Any reverse bulge or flattening of the interventricular septum indicates pulmonary hypertension.

Pericardial effusion may also be seen in pulmonary hypertension. Thickening of pericardium more than 4 mm or pericardial calcification indicates constrictive pericarditis.
