= Pulmonary embolism =

Blockage of an artery in the lungs

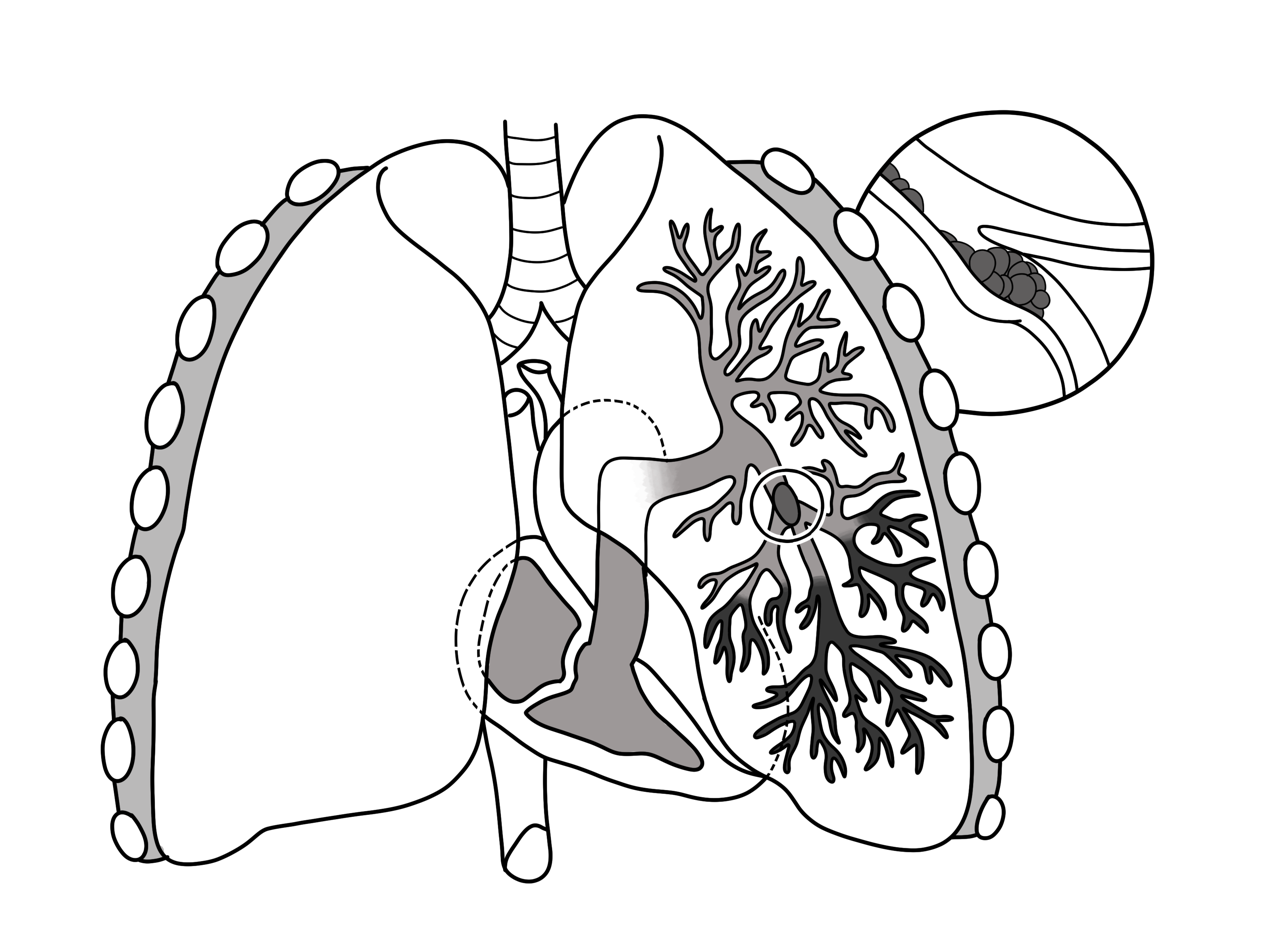
- A lung illustration depicting a pulmonary embolism as a thrombus (blood clot) that has travelled from another region of the body, causes occlusion of the pulmonary bronchial artery, leading to arterial thrombosis of the superior and inferior lobes in the left lung
- Specialty: Hematology, cardiology, pulmonology, emergency medicine
- Symptoms: Shortness of breath, chest pain, coughing up blood
- Complications: Passing out, abnormally low blood pressure, sudden death; chronic thromboembolic pulmonary hypertension (long-term complication)
- Usual onset: Advanced age
- Risk factors: Cancer, prolonged bed rest, blunt trauma, smoking, stroke, certain genetic conditions, estrogen-based medication, pregnancy, obesity, after surgery
- Diagnostic method: Based on symptoms, D-dimer, CT pulmonary angiography, lung ventilation/perfusion scan
- Differential diagnosis: Acute coronary syndrome, aortic dissection, panic attack, pneumothorax
- Treatment: Anticoagulants (heparin, warfarin, DOACs), thrombolysis, thrombectomy
- Frequency: ~450,000 per year (USA), 430,000 (Europe)
- Deaths: >10–12,000 per year (US), >30–40,000 per year (Europe)

Pulmonary embolism (PE) is a blockage of an artery in the lungs by a substance that has moved from elsewhere in the body through the bloodstream (embolism). Symptoms of a PE may include shortness of breath, chest pain particularly upon breathing in, and coughing up blood. Symptoms of a blood clot in the leg may also be present, such as a red, warm, swollen, and painful leg. Signs of a PE include low blood oxygen levels, rapid breathing, rapid heart rate, and sometimes a mild fever. Severe cases can lead to passing out, abnormally low blood pressure, obstructive shock, and sudden death.

PE usually results from a blood clot in the leg that travels to the lung. The risk of blood clots is increased by advanced age, cancer, prolonged bed rest and immobilization, smoking, stroke, long-haul travel over 4 hours, certain genetic conditions, estrogen-based medication, pregnancy, obesity, trauma or bone fracture, and after some types of surgery. A small proportion of cases are due to the embolization of air, fat, or amniotic fluid. Diagnosis is based on signs and symptoms in combination with test results. If the risk is low, a blood test known as a D-dimer may rule out the condition. Otherwise, a CT pulmonary angiography, lung ventilation/perfusion scan, or ultrasound of the legs may confirm the diagnosis. Together, deep vein thrombosis and PE are known as venous thromboembolism (VTE).

Efforts to prevent PE include beginning to move as soon as possible after surgery, lower leg exercises during periods of sitting, and the use of blood thinners after some types of surgery. Treatment is with anticoagulant medications such as heparin, warfarin, or one of the direct-acting oral anticoagulants (DOACs). These are recommended to be taken for at least three months. However, treatment using low-molecular-weight heparin is not recommended for those at high risk of bleeding or those with renal failure. Severe cases may require thrombolysis using medication such as tissue plasminogen activator (tPA) given intravenously or through a catheter, and some may require surgery (a pulmonary thrombectomy). If blood thinners are not appropriate or safe to use, a temporary vena cava filter may be used.

Pulmonary emboli affect about 430,000 people each year in Europe. In the United States, between 300,000 and 600,000 cases occur each year, which contribute to at least 40,000 deaths. Rates are similar in males and females. They become more common as people get older.

== Signs and symptoms ==
Symptoms of pulmonary embolism are typically sudden in onset and may include one or many of the following: dyspnea (shortness of breath), tachypnea (rapid breathing), chest pain of a "pleuritic" nature (worsened by breathing), cough and hemoptysis (coughing up blood). More severe cases can include signs such as cyanosis (blue discoloration, usually of the lips and fingers), collapse, and circulatory instability because of decreased blood flow through the lungs and into the left side of the heart. About 15% of all cases of sudden death are attributable to PE. While PE may present with syncope (fainting), less than 1% of syncope cases are due to PE.

On physical examination, the lungs are usually normal. Occasionally, a pleural friction rub may be audible over the affected area of the lung (mostly in PE with infarct). A pleural effusion is sometimes present that is exudative (fluid that leaks out of blood vessels). This is detectable by decreased percussion note, audible breath sounds, and vocal resonance. The strain on the right ventricle may be detected as a left parasternal heave, a loud pulmonary component of the second heart sound, or raised jugular venous pressure. A low-grade fever may be present, particularly if there is associated pulmonary hemorrhage or infarction.

As smaller pulmonary emboli tend to lodge in more peripheral areas without collateral circulation, they are more likely to cause lung infarction and small effusions (both of which are painful), but not hypoxia, dyspnea, or hemodynamic instability such as tachycardia. Larger PEs, which tend to lodge centrally, typically cause dyspnea, hypoxia, low blood pressure, fast heart rate and fainting, but are often painless because there is no lung infarction due to collateral circulation. The classic presentation for PE with pleuritic pain, dyspnea, and tachycardia is likely caused by a large fragmented embolism causing both large and small PEs. Thus, small PEs are often missed because they cause pleuritic pain alone without any other findings and large PEs are often missed because they are painless and mimic other conditions often causing ECG changes and small rises in troponin and brain natriuretic peptide levels.

PEs are sometimes described as massive, submassive, and nonmassive depending on the clinical signs and symptoms. Although the exact definitions of these are unclear, an accepted definition of massive PE is one in which there is hemodynamic instability. This is a cause of obstructive shock, which presents as sustained low blood pressure, slowed heart rate, or pulselessness.

== Risk factors ==
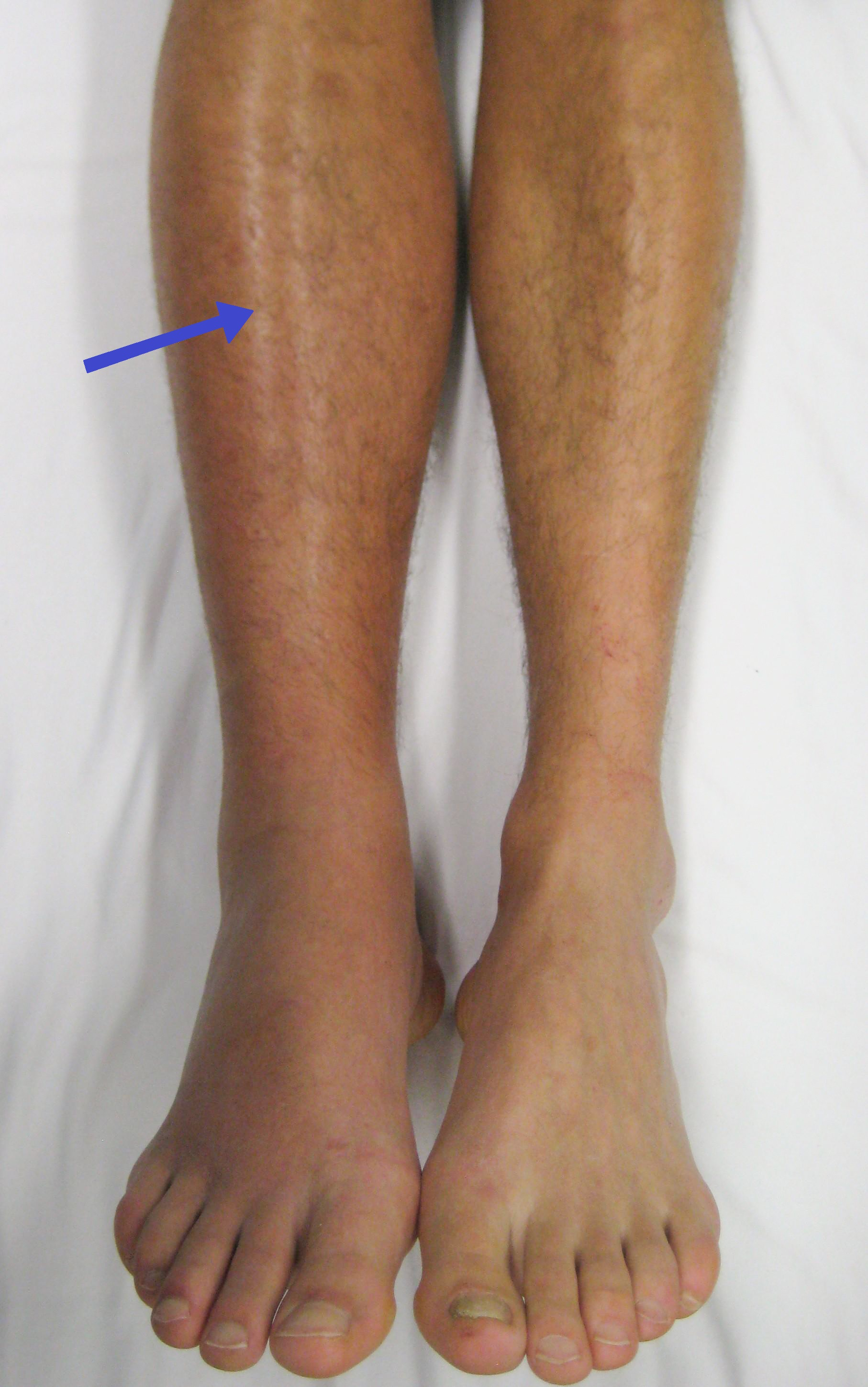
A deep vein thrombosis as seen with signs of redness and swelling in the right leg is a risk factor for PE.

About 90% of emboli are from a deep vein thrombosis located above the knee termed a proximal DVT, which includes an iliofemoral DVT. The rare venous thoracic outlet syndrome can also be a cause of DVTs, especially in young men without significant risk factors. DVTs are at risk for dislodging and migrating to the lung circulation. The conditions are generally regarded as a continuum known as a venous thromboembolism (VTE).

VTE is much more common in immunocompromised individuals as well as individuals with comorbidities including:

- Those that undergo orthopedic surgery at or below the hip without prophylaxis.
  - This is due to immobility during or after the surgery, as well as venous damage during the surgery.
- Pancreatic and colon cancer patients (other forms of cancer also can be factors, but these are the most common)
  - This is due to the release of procoagulants.
    - The risk of VTE is at its greatest during diagnosis and treatment but lowers in remission.
- Patients with high-grade tumors
- Pregnant women
  - As the body puts itself into what is known as a "hypercoagulable state" the risk of a hemorrhage during childbirth is decreased and is regulated by increased expression of factors VII, VIII, X, Von Willebrand, and fibrinogen.
- Those on estrogen medication
  - No linkage has been found to those taking progestin-only oral contraceptives.

The development of thrombosis is classically due to a group of causes named Virchow's triad (alterations in blood flow, factors in the vessel wall, and factors affecting the properties of the blood). Often, more than one risk factor is present.

- Alterations in blood flow: immobilization (after surgery, long-haul flight), injury, pregnancy (also procoagulant), obesity (also procoagulant), cancer (also procoagulant)
- Factors in the vessel wall: surgery, catheterizations causing direct injury ("endothelial injury")
- Factors affecting the properties of the blood (procoagulant state):
  - Estrogen-containing medication (transgender hormone therapy, menopausal hormone therapy and hormonal contraceptives)
  - Genetic thrombophilia (factor V Leiden, prothrombin mutation G20210A, protein C deficiency, protein S deficiency, antithrombin deficiency, hyperhomocysteinemia and plasminogen/fibrinolysis disorders)
  - Acquired thrombophilia (antiphospholipid syndrome, nephrotic syndrome, paroxysmal nocturnal hemoglobinuria)
  - Cancer (due to secretion of pro-coagulants)

Although most pulmonary embolisms are the result of proximal DVTs, there are still many other risk factors that can also result in a pulmonary embolism.

- Risk factors include:
  - Varicose veins caused by vascular damage
  - Pulmonary hypertension
  - Diabetes
  - Traumatic hip fractures that immobilize the patient
  - Joint fixation (primarily in the legs)

=== Underlying causes ===
After a first PE, the search for secondary causes is usually brief. Only when a second PE occurs, and especially when this happens while still under anticoagulant therapy, a further search for underlying conditions is undertaken. This will include testing ("thrombophilia screen") for Factor V Leiden mutation, antiphospholipid antibodies, protein C and S and antithrombin levels, and later prothrombin mutation, MTHFR mutation, Factor VIII concentration and rarer inherited coagulation abnormalities.

== Diagnosis ==
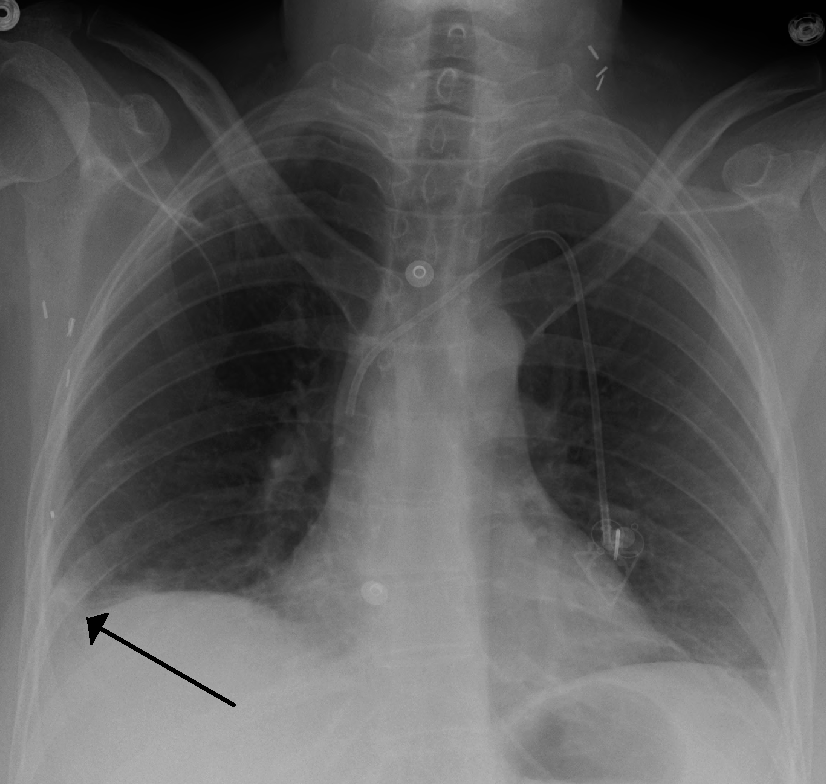
A Hampton hump in a person with a right lower lobe pulmonary embolism

To diagnose a pulmonary embolism, a review of clinical criteria to determine the need for testing is recommended. In those who have low risk, age less than 50, heart rate less than 100 beats per minute, oxygen level more than 94% on room air, and no leg swelling, coughing up of blood, surgery or trauma in the last four weeks, previous blood clots, or estrogen use, further testing is not typically needed.

In situations with more high-risk individuals, further testing is needed. A CT pulmonary angiogram (CTPA) is the preferred method for the diagnosis of a pulmonary embolism due to its easy administration and accuracy. Although a CTPA is preferred, other tests can be done. For example, a proximal lower limb compression ultrasound (CUS) can be used. This is a test that is primarily used as a confirmatory test, meaning it confirms a previous analysis showing the presence or suspected presence of a pulmonary embolism. According to a cross-sectional study, CUS tests have a sensitivity of 41% and specificity of 96%.

If there are concerns this is followed by testing to determine a likelihood of being able to confirm a diagnosis by imaging, followed by imaging if other tests have shown that there is a likelihood of a PE diagnosis.

The diagnosis of PE is based primarily on validated clinical criteria combined with selective testing because the typical clinical presentation (shortness of breath, chest pain) cannot be definitively differentiated from other causes of chest pain and shortness of breath. The decision to perform medical imaging is based on clinical reasoning, that is the medical history, symptoms, and findings on physical examination, followed by an assessment of clinical probability.

=== Probability testing ===
The most commonly used method to predict clinical probability, the Wells score, is a clinical prediction rule, whose use is complicated by multiple versions being available. In 1995, Philip Steven Wells, initially developed a prediction rule (based on a literature search) to predict the likelihood of DVT, based on clinical criteria. A new prediction score for PE was created in 1998. This prediction rule was revised by Wells et al. in 2000. In the 2000 publication, Wells proposed two different scoring systems using cutoffs of 2 or 4 with the same prediction rule, and also included D-dimer testing in the rule-out of PE in low probability patients. In 2001, Wells published results using the more conservative cutoff of 2 to create three categories. An additional version, the "modified extended version", using the more recent cutoff of 2 but including findings from Wells's initial studies were proposed. Most recently, a further study reverted to Wells's earlier use of a cutoff of 4 points to create only two categories.

There are additional prediction rules for PE, such as the Geneva rule. More importantly, the use of any rule is associated with reduction in recurrent thromboembolism.

The Wells score:

- clinically suspected DVT – 3.0 points
- alternative diagnosis is less likely than PE – 3.0 points
- tachycardia (heart rate > 100) – 1.5 points
- immobilization (≥ 3d)/surgery in previous four weeks – 1.5 points
- history of DVT or PE – 1.5 points
- hemoptysis – 1.0 points
- malignancy (with treatment within six months) or palliative – 1.0 points

Traditional interpretation

- Score >6.0 – High (probability 59% based on pooled data)
- Score 2.0 to 6.0 – Moderate (probability 29% based on pooled data)
- Score <2.0 – Low (probability 15% based on pooled data)

Alternative interpretation

- Score > 4 – PE likely. Consider diagnostic imaging.
- Score 4 or less – PE unlikely. Consider D-dimer to rule out PE.

Recommendations for a diagnostic algorithm were published by the PIOPED investigators; however, these recommendations do not reflect research using 64-slice MDCT. These investigators recommended:

- Low clinical probability. If negative D-dimer, PE is excluded. If positive D-dimer, obtain MDCT and base treatment on results.
- Moderate clinical probability. If negative D-dimer, PE is excluded. However, the authors were not concerned that a negative MDCT with negative D-dimer in this setting has a 5% probability of being false. Presumably, the 5% error rate will fall as 64-slice MDCT is more commonly used. If positive D-dimer, obtain MDCT and base treatment on results.
- High clinical probability. Proceed to MDCT. If positive, treat, if negative, more tests are needed to exclude PE. A D-dimer of less than 750 ug/L does not rule out PE in those who are at high risk.

==== Pulmonary embolism rule-out criteria ====
The pulmonary embolism rule-out criteria (PERC) helps assess people in whom pulmonary embolism is suspected, but unlikely. Unlike the Wells score and Geneva score, which are clinical prediction rules intended to risk stratify people with suspected PE, the PERC rule is designed to rule out the risk of PE in people when the physician has already stratified them into a low-risk category.

People in this low-risk category without any of these criteria may undergo no further testing for PE: low oxygen saturations – Sa_{O_{2}} <95%, unilateral leg swelling, coughing up blood, prior DVT or PE, recent surgery or trauma, age >50, hormone use, fast heart rate. The rationale behind this decision is that further testing (specifically CT angiogram of the chest) may cause more harm (from radiation exposure and contrast dye) than the risk of PE. The PERC rule has a sensitivity of 97.4% and specificity of 21.9% with a false negative rate of 1.0% (16/1666).

=== Blood tests ===
In people with a low or moderate suspicion of PE, a normal D-dimer level (shown in a blood test) is enough to exclude the possibility of thrombotic PE, with a three-month risk of thromboembolic events being 0.14%. D-dimer is highly sensitive but not specific (specificity around 50%). In other words, a positive D-dimer is not synonymous with PE, but a negative D-dimer is, with a good degree of certainty, an indication of absence of a PE. A low pretest probability is also valuable in ruling out PE. The typical cut off is 500 μg/L, although this varies based on the assay. However, in those over the age of 50, changing the cut-off value to the person's age multiplied by 10 μg/L (accounting for assay which has been used) is recommended as it decreases the number of falsely positive tests without missing any additional cases of PE.

When a PE is being suspected, several blood tests are done to exclude important secondary causes of PE. This includes a full blood count, clotting status (PT, aPTT, TT), and some screening tests (erythrocyte sedimentation rate, kidney function, liver enzymes, electrolytes). If one of these is abnormal, further investigations might be warranted to the issue.

Troponin levels are increased in between 16 and 47% with pulmonary embolism.

=== Imaging ===
In typical people who are not known to be at high risk of PE, imaging is helpful to confirm or exclude a diagnosis of PE after simpler first-line tests are used. Medical societies recommend tests such as the D-dimer to first provide supporting evidence for the need for imaging, and imaging would be done if other tests confirmed a moderate or high probability of finding evidence to support a diagnosis of PE.

CT pulmonary angiography is the recommended first-line diagnostic imaging test for most people.

Ultrasound of the legs can confirm the presence of a PE but cannot rule it out.

==== CT pulmonary angiography ====
CT pulmonary angiography (CTPA) is a pulmonary angiogram obtained using computed tomography (CT) with radiocontrast rather than right heart catheterization. Its advantages are that it is accurate, it is non-invasive, it is more often available, and it may identify other lung disorders in case there is no pulmonary embolism. The accuracy and non-invasive nature of CTPA also make it advantageous for people who are pregnant.

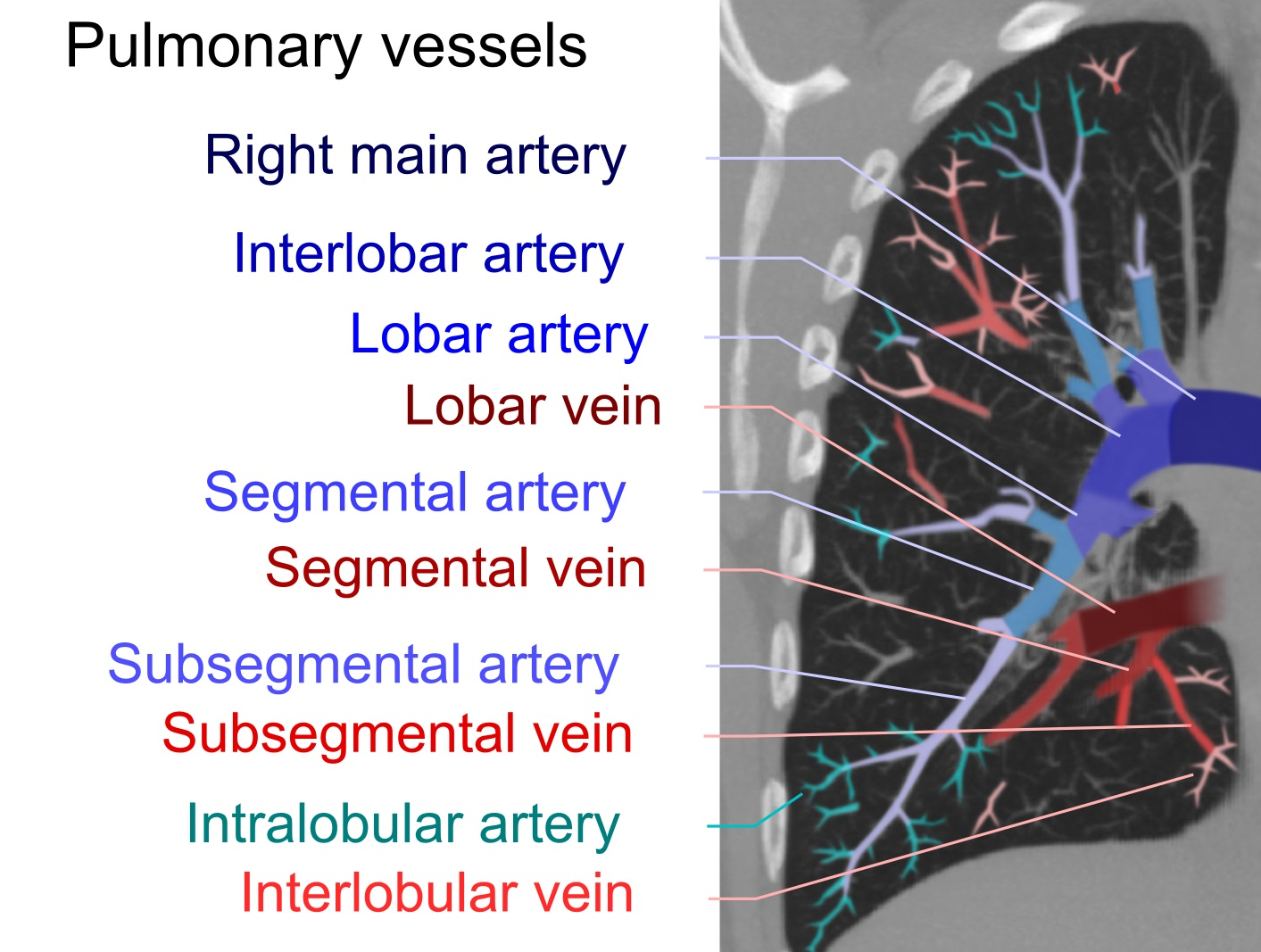
On CT scan, pulmonary emboli can be classified according to the level along the arterial tree.

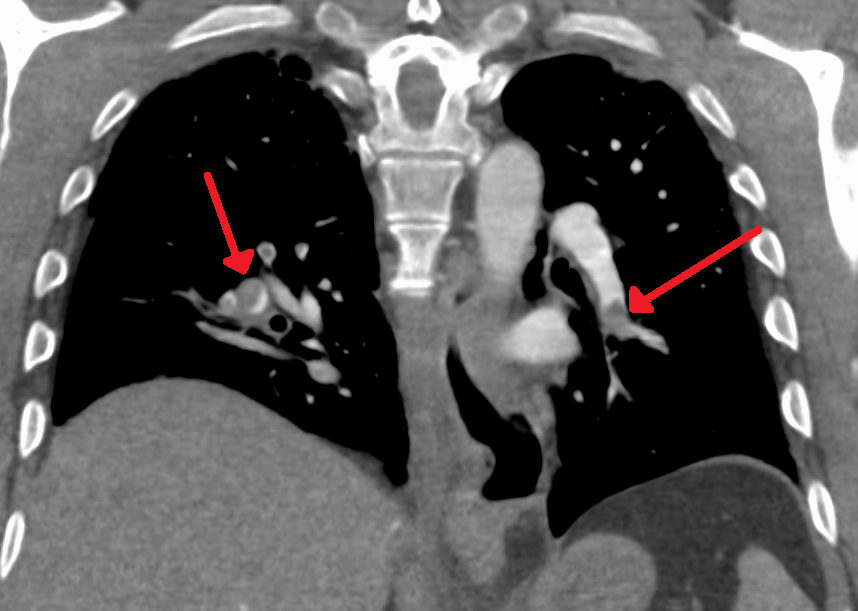
Segmental and subsegmental pulmonary emboli on both sides

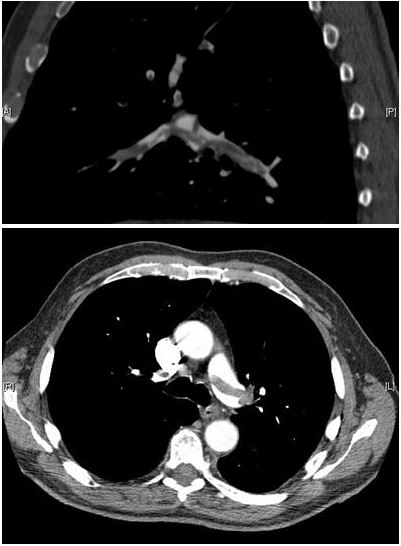
CT pulmonary angiography showing a "saddle embolus" at the bifurcation of the main pulmonary artery and thrombus burden in the lobar arteries on both sides

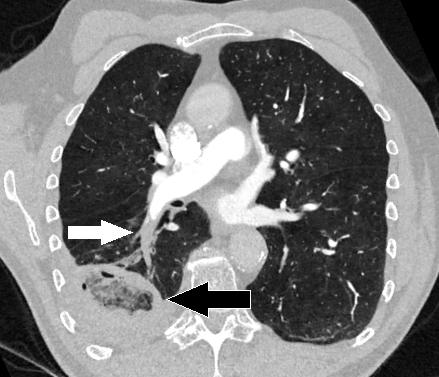
Pulmonary embolism (white arrow) that has been long-standing and has caused a lung infarction (black arrow) seen as a reverse halo sign

Assessing the accuracy of CT pulmonary angiography is hindered by the rapid changes in the number of rows of detectors available in multidetector CT (MDCT) machines. According to a cohort study, single-slice spiral CT may help diagnose detection among people with suspected pulmonary embolism. In this study, the sensitivity was 69% and specificity was 84%. In this study which had a prevalence of detection was 32%, the positive predictive value of 67.0% and negative predictive value of 85.2%. However, this study's results may be biased due to possible incorporation bias, since the CT scan was the final diagnostic tool in people with pulmonary embolism. The authors noted that a negative single-slice CT scan is insufficient to rule out pulmonary embolism on its own. A separate study with a mixture of 4-slice and 16-slice scanners reported a sensitivity of 83% and a specificity of 96%, which means that it is a good test for ruling out a pulmonary embolism if it is not seen on imaging and that it is very good at confirming a pulmonary embolism is present if it is seen. This study noted that additional testing is necessary when the clinical probability is inconsistent with the imaging results. CTPA is non-inferior to VQ scanning, and identifies more emboli (without necessarily improving the outcome) compared to VQ scanning.

==== Ventilation/perfusion scan ====
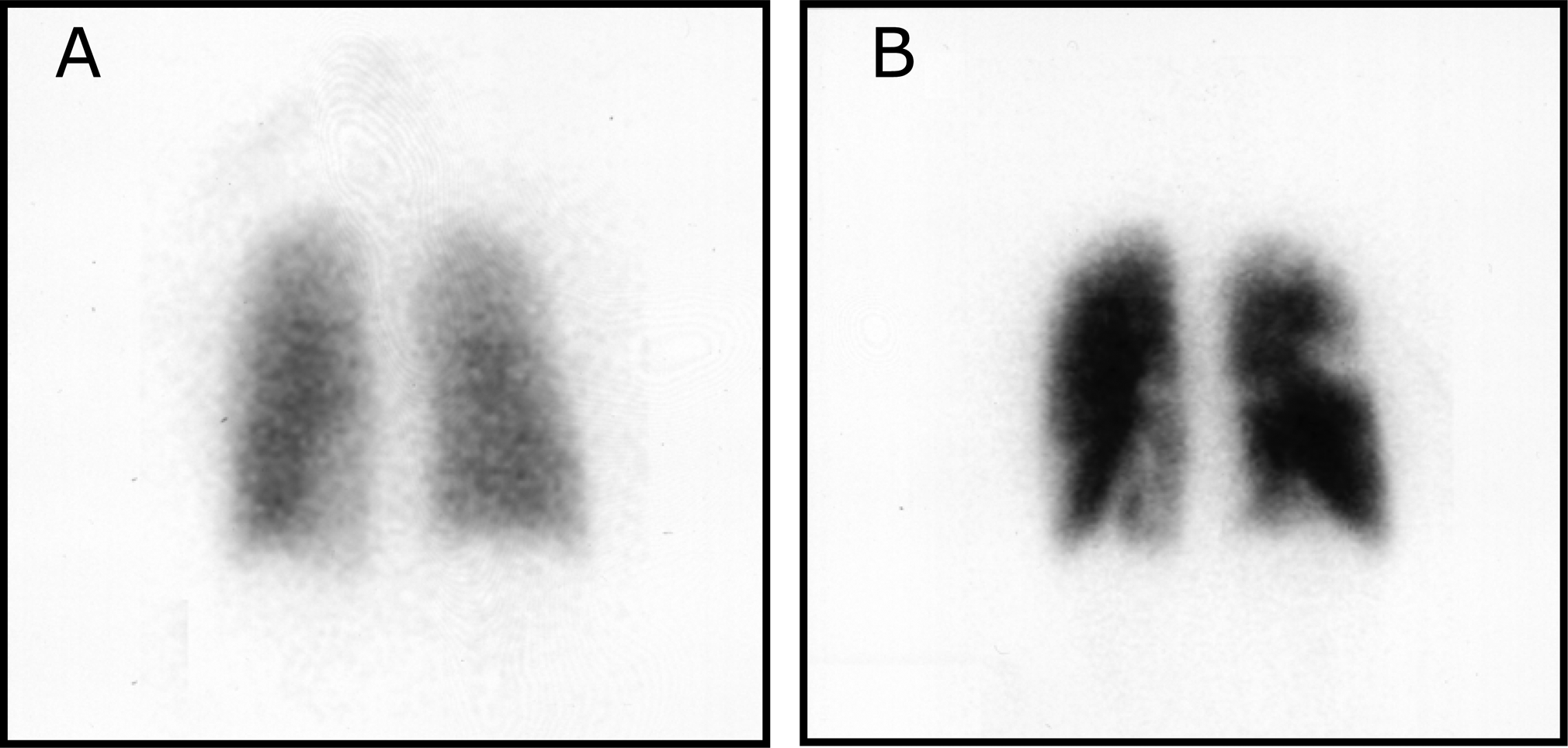
Ventilation-perfusion scintigraphy (A) After inhalation of 20 mCi of Xenon-133 gas, scintigraphic images were obtained in the posterior projection, showing uniform ventilation to lungs. (B) After intravenous injection of 4 mCi of Technetium-99m-labeled albumin, scintigraphic images are shown here in the posterior projection. This and other views showed decreased activity in multiple regions.

A ventilation/perfusion scan (or V/Q scan or lung scintigraphy) shows that some areas of the lung are being ventilated but not perfused with blood (due to obstruction by a clot). This type of examination is as accurate as multislice CT, but is less used, due to the greater availability of CT technology. It is particularly useful in people who have an allergy to iodinated contrast, impaired kidney function, or are pregnant (due to its lower radiation exposure as compared to CT). The test can be performed with planar two-dimensional imaging, or single-photon emission computed tomography (SPECT) which enables three-dimensional imaging. Hybrid devices combining SPECT and CT (SPECT/CT) further enable anatomic characterization of any abnormality.

==== Low probability diagnostic tests/non-diagnostic tests ====
Tests that are frequently done that are not sensitive for PE, but can be diagnostic.

- Chest X-rays are often done on people with shortness of breath to help rule out other causes, such as congestive heart failure and rib fracture. Chest X-rays in PE are rarely normal, but usually lack signs that suggest the diagnosis of PE (for example, Westermark sign, Hampton's hump).
- Ultrasonography of the legs, also known as leg doppler, in search of deep venous thrombosis (DVT). The presence of DVT, as shown on ultrasonography of the legs, is in itself enough to warrant anticoagulation, without requiring the V/Q or spiral CT scans (because of the strong association between DVT and PE). This may be a valid approach in pregnancy, in which the other modalities would increase the risk of birth defects in the unborn child. However, a negative scan does not rule out PE, and low-radiation dose scanning may be required if the mother is deemed at high risk of having a pulmonary embolism. The main use of ultrasonography of the legs is therefore in those with clinical symptoms suggestive of deep vein thrombosis.

==== Fluoroscopic pulmonary angiography ====
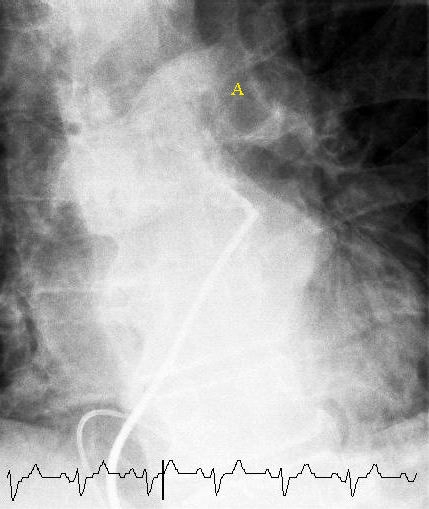
Selective pulmonary angiogram revealing clot (labeled A) causing a central obstruction in the left main pulmonary artery. ECG tracing is shown at the bottom.

Historically, the gold standard for diagnosis was pulmonary angiography by fluoroscopy, but this has fallen into disuse with the increased availability of non-invasive techniques that offer similar diagnostic accuracy.

=== Electrocardiogram ===
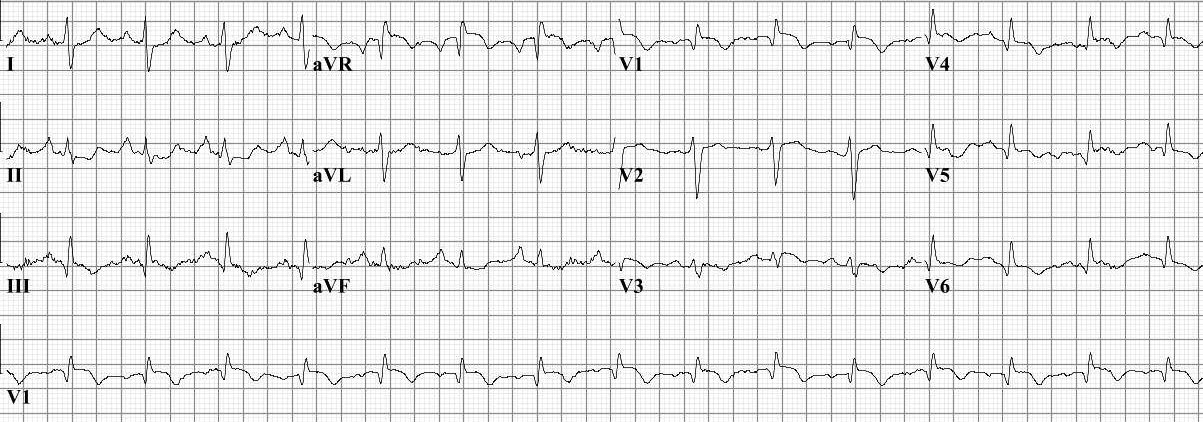
Electrocardiogram of a person with pulmonary embolism, showing sinus tachycardia of approximately 100 beats per minute, large S wave in Lead I, moderate Q wave in Lead III, inverted T wave in Lead III, and inverted T waves in leads V1 and V3

The primary use of the ECG is to rule out other causes of chest pain. An electrocardiogram (ECG) is routinely done on people with chest pain to quickly diagnose myocardial infarctions (heart attacks), an important differential diagnosis in an individual with chest pain. While certain ECG changes may occur with PE, none are specific enough to confirm or sensitive enough to rule out the diagnosis. An ECG may show signs of right heart strain or acute cor pulmonale in cases of large PEs – the classic signs are a large S wave in lead I, a large Q wave in lead III, and an inverted T wave in lead III (S1Q3T3), which occurs in 12–50% of people with the diagnosis, yet also occurs in 12% without the diagnosis.

This is occasionally present (occurring in up to 20% of people), but may also occur in other acute lung conditions, and, therefore, has limited diagnostic value. The most commonly seen signs in the ECG are sinus tachycardia, right axis deviation, and right bundle branch block. Sinus tachycardia, however, is still only found in 8–69% of people with PE.

ECG findings associated with pulmonary emboli may suggest a worse prognosis since the six findings identified with RV strain on ECG (heart rate > 100 beats per minute, S1Q3T3, inverted T waves in leads V1-V4, ST elevation in aVR, complete right bundle branch block, and atrial fibrillation) are associated with increased risk of circulatory shock and death.

Cases with inverted T in leads V_{1-3} are suspected of PE or inferior myocardial infarction. PE cases show inverted T waves in leads II and aV_{F}, but inferior myocardial infarction cases do not show inverted T waves in II and aV_{F}.

=== Echocardiography ===
In massive and submassive PE, dysfunction of the right side of the heart may be seen on echocardiography, an indication that the pulmonary artery is severely obstructed and the right ventricle, a low-pressure pump, is unable to match the pressure. Some studies (see below) suggest that this finding may be an indication for thrombolysis. Not every person with a (suspected) pulmonary embolism requires an echocardiogram, but elevations in cardiac troponins or brain natriuretic peptide may indicate heart strain and warrant an echocardiogram, and be important in prognosis.

The specific appearance of the right ventricle on echocardiography is referred to as the McConnell's sign. This is the finding of akinesia of the mid-free wall but a normal motion of the apex. This phenomenon has a 77% sensitivity and a 94% specificity for the diagnosis of acute pulmonary embolism in the setting of right ventricular dysfunction.

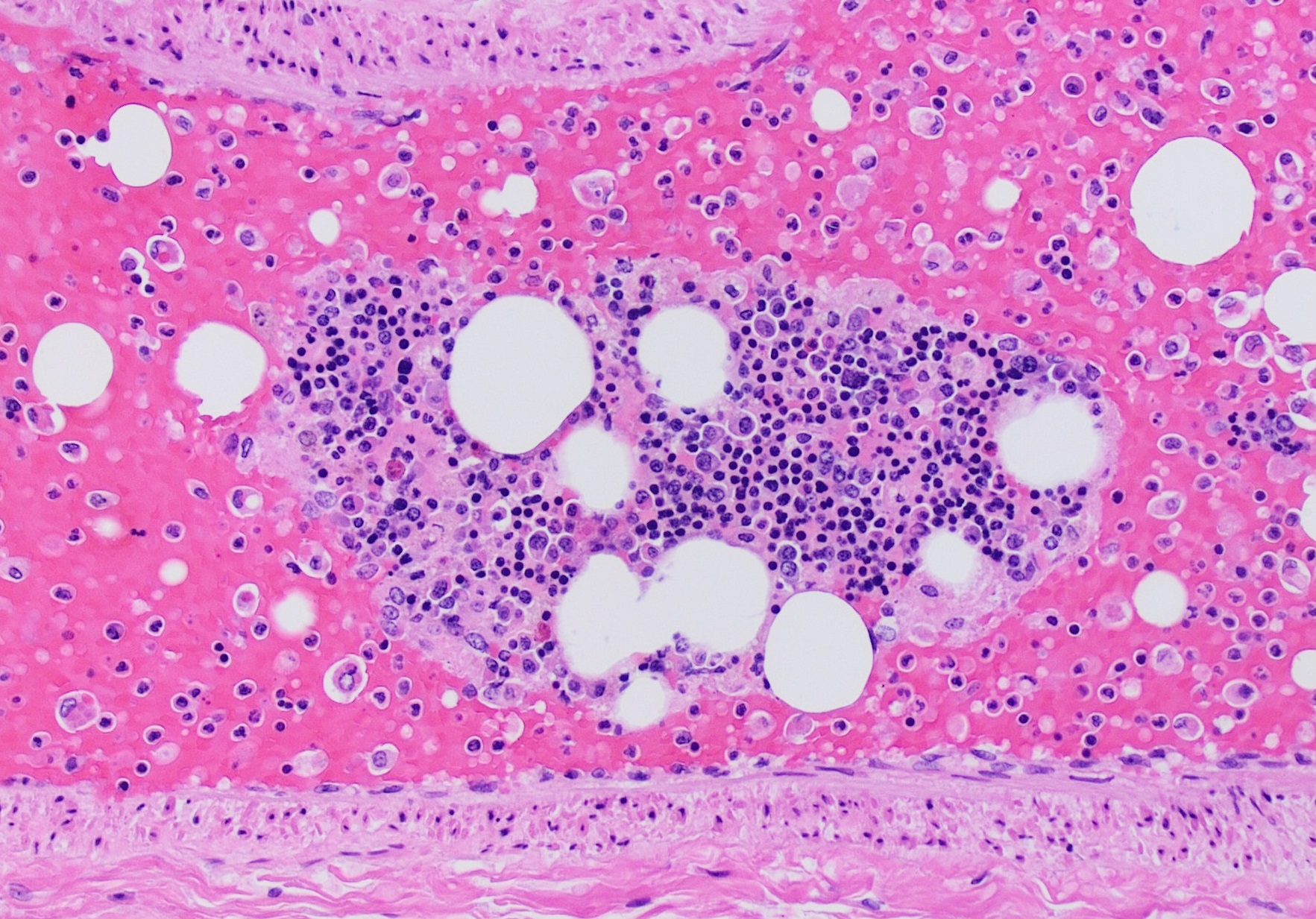
Histopathology of a pulmonary artery from autopsy. It shows a fat embolism (seen as multiple empty globular spaces on this H&E stain since its processing dissolves fat). There is a bone marrow fragment in the middle, and multiple single hematopoietic cells in the blood, being evidence of fracture as the source of the embolism.

Ultrasound of the heart showing signs of PE

Ultrasound of the heart showing signs of PE

== Prevention ==
Pulmonary embolism may be preventable in those with risk factors. People admitted to the hospital may receive preventative medication, including unfractionated heparin, low molecular weight heparin (LMWH), or fondaparinux, and anti-thrombosis stockings to reduce the risk of a DVT in the leg that could dislodge and migrate to the lungs.

Following the completion of anticoagulation in those with prior PE, long-term aspirin is useful to prevent recurrence.

== Treatment ==
Anticoagulant therapy is the mainstay of treatment. Acutely, supportive treatments, such as oxygen or analgesia, may be required. People are often admitted to hospital in the early stages of treatment and tend to remain under inpatient care until the INR has reached therapeutic levels (if warfarin is used). Increasingly, however, low-risk cases are managed at home in a fashion already common in the treatment of DVT. Evidence to support one approach versus the other is weak.

=== Anticoagulation ===
Anticoagulant therapy is the mainstay of treatment. For many years, vitamin K antagonists (warfarin or less commonly acenocoumarol or phenprocoumon) have been the cornerstone. As vitamin K antagonists do not act immediately, initial treatment is with rapidly acting injectable anticoagulants: unfractionated heparin (UFH), low molecular weight heparin (LMWH), or fondaparinux, while oral vitamin K antagonists are initiated and titrated (usually as part of inpatient hospital care) to the international normalized ratio, a test that determines the dose. In terms of injectable treatments, LMWH may reduce bleeding among people with pulmonary embolism as compared to UFH. According to the same review, LMWH reduced the incidence of recurrent thrombotic complications and reduced thrombus size when compared to heparin. There was no difference in overall mortality between participants treated with LMWH and those treated with unfractionated heparin. Vitamin K antagonists require frequent dose adjustment and monitoring of the international normalized ratio (INR). In PE, INRs between 2.0 and 3.0 are generally considered ideal. If another episode of PE occurs under warfarin treatment, the INR window may be increased to e.g. 2.5–3.5 (unless there are contraindications) or anticoagulation may be changed to a different anticoagulant e.g. LMWH.

In recent years, many anticoagulants have been introduced that offer similar to warfarin but without a need for titration to the INR. Known as the directly acting oral anticoagulants, these treatments are now preferred over vitamin K antagonists by American professional guidelines. Two of these (rivaroxaban and apixaban) do not require initial heparin or fondaparinux treatment, whereas dabigatran and edoxaban do. A Cochrane review found that there is no evidence of a difference between oral DTIs (dabigatran, rivaroxaban, edoxaban, apixaban) and standard anticoagulation in the prevention of recurrent pulmonary embolism.

In people with cancer who develop pulmonary embolism, therapy with a course of LMWH is favored over warfarin or other oral anticoagulants. Similarly, pregnant women are treated with low molecular weight heparin until after delivery to avoid the known teratogenic effects of warfarin, especially in the early stages of pregnancy, but it can be used while breastfeeding.

Anticoagulation therapy is usually continued for 3–6 months, or "lifelong" if there have been previous DVTs or PEs, or none of the usual transient risk factors is present. In those without a known cause that can be reversed 2 years of treatment may be better than 6 months. For those with small PEs (known as subsegmental PEs) the effects of anticoagulation are unknown as it has not been properly studied as of 2020.

=== Thrombolysis ===
Massive PE causing hemodynamic instability (shock and/or low blood pressure, defined as a systolic blood pressure <90 mmHg or a pressure drop of 40 mmHg for >15 min if not caused by new-onset arrhythmia, hypovolemia, or sepsis) is an indication for thrombolysis, the enzymatic destruction of the clot with medication. In this situation, it is the best available treatment for those without contraindications and is supported by clinical guidelines. It is also recommended in those in cardiac arrest with a known PE. Catheter-directed thrombolysis (CDT) is a new technique found to be relatively safe and effective for massive PEs. This involves accessing the venous system by placing a catheter into a vein in the groin and guiding it through the veins by using fluoroscopic imaging until it is located next to the PE in the lung circulation. Medication that breaks up blood clots is released through the catheter so that its highest concentration is directly next to the pulmonary embolus. CDT is performed by interventional radiologists or vascular surgeons, and in medical centers that offer CDT, it may be offered as a first-line treatment. Catheter-based ultrasound-assisted thrombolysis is being investigated.

The use of thrombolysis in non-massive PEs is still debated. Some have found that the treatment decreases the risk of death and increases the risk of bleeding including intracranial hemorrhage. Others have found no decrease in the risk of death.

=== Inferior vena cava filter ===
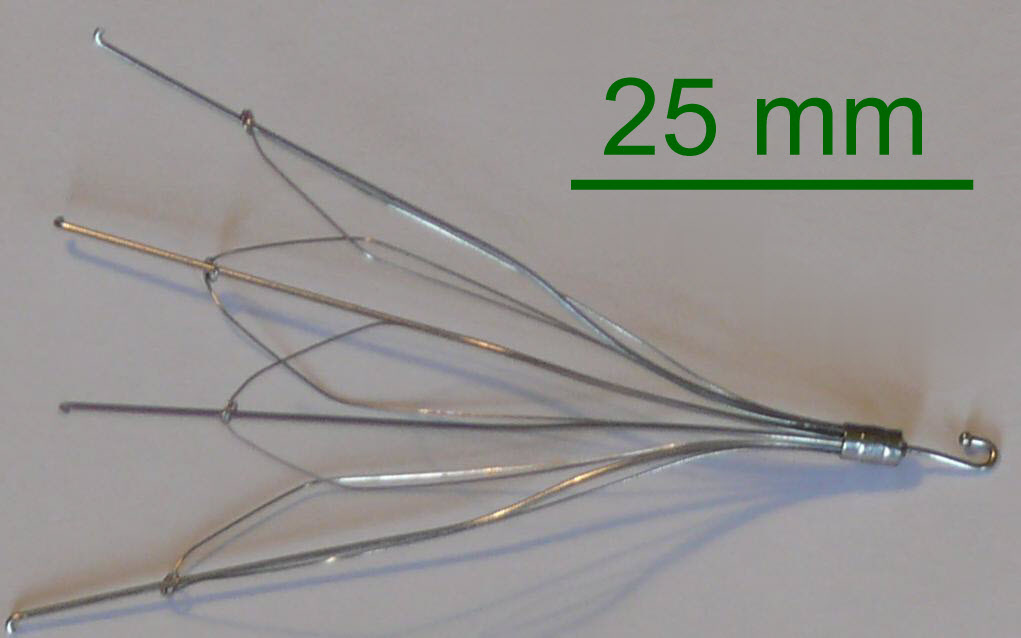
Used inferior vena cava filter

There are two situations when an inferior vena cava filter is considered advantageous, and those are if anticoagulant therapy is contraindicated (e.g. shortly after a major operation), or a person has a pulmonary embolus despite being anticoagulated. In these instances, it may be implanted to prevent new or existing DVTs from entering the pulmonary artery and combining with an existing blockage. Despite the device's theoretical advantage of preventing pulmonary emboli, there is a lack of evidence supporting its effectiveness.

Inferior vena cava filters should be removed as soon as it becomes safe to start using anticoagulation. Although modern filters are meant to be retrievable, complications may prevent some from being removed. The long-term safety profile of permanently leaving a filter inside the body is not known.

=== Surgery ===
Surgical management of acute pulmonary embolism (pulmonary thrombectomy) is uncommon and has largely been abandoned because of poor long-term outcomes. However, recently, it has gone through a resurgence with the revision of the surgical technique and is thought to benefit certain people. Chronic pulmonary embolism leading to pulmonary hypertension (known as chronic thromboembolic hypertension) is treated with a surgical procedure known as a pulmonary thromboendarterectomy.

== Prognosis ==
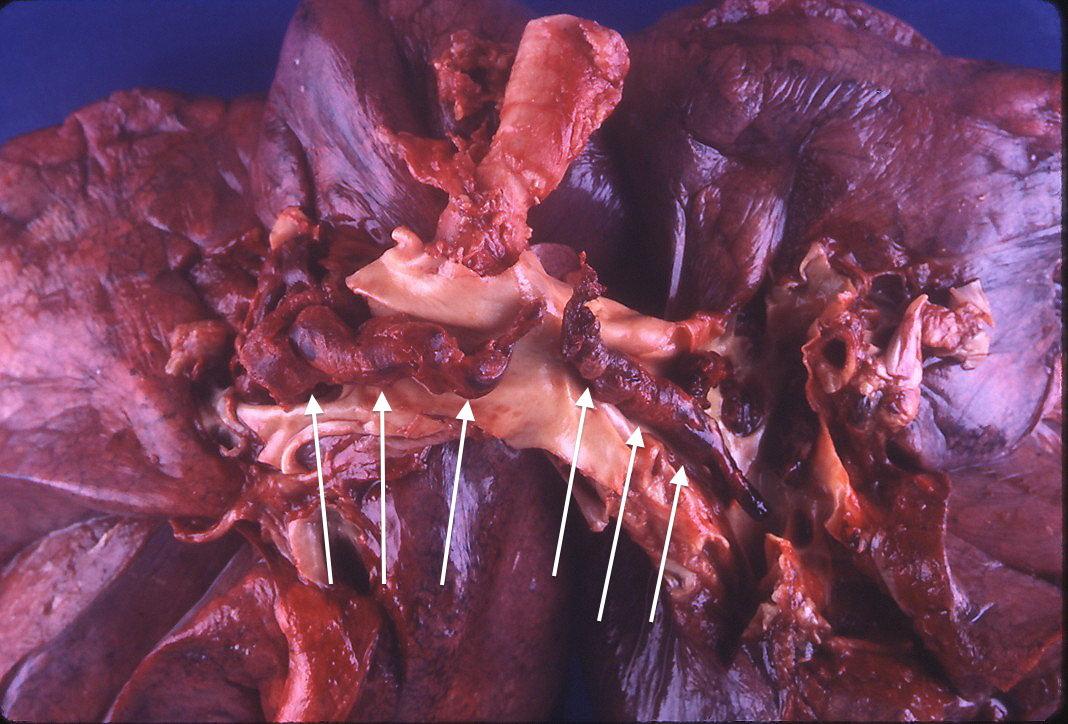
Large saddle embolus seen in the pulmonary artery (white arrows)

Fewer than 5 to 10% of symptomatic PEs are fatal within the first hour of symptoms.

There are several markers used for risk stratification and these are also independent predictors of adverse outcomes. These include hypotension, cardiogenic shock, syncope, evidence of right heart dysfunction, and elevated cardiac enzymes. Some ECG changes including S1Q3T3 also correlate with a worse short-term prognosis. There have been other patient-related factors such as COPD and chronic heart failure thought to also play a role in prognosis.

Prognosis depends on the amount of lung that is affected and on the co-existence of other medical conditions; chronic embolisation to the lung can lead to pulmonary hypertension. After a massive PE, the embolus must be resolved somehow if the patient is to survive. In thrombotic PE, the blood clot may be broken down by fibrinolysis, or it may be organized and recanalized so that a new channel forms through the clot. Blood flow is restored most rapidly in the first day or two after a PE. Improvement slows thereafter and some deficits may be permanent. There is controversy over whether small subsegmental PEs need treatment at all and some evidence exists that patients with subsegmental PEs may do well without treatment.

Once anticoagulation is stopped, the risk of a fatal pulmonary embolism is 0.5% per year.

Mortality from untreated PEs was said to be 26%. This figure comes from a trial published in 1960 by Barrit and Jordan, which compared anticoagulation against a placebo for the management of PE. Barritt and Jordan performed their study in the Bristol Royal Infirmary in 1957. This study is the only placebo-controlled trial ever to examine the place of anticoagulants in the treatment of PE, the results of which were so convincing that the trial has never been repeated as to do so would be considered unethical. That said, the reported mortality rate of 26% in the placebo group is probably an overstatement, given that the technology of the day may have detected only severe PEs.

=== Predicting mortality ===
The PESI and sPESI (= simplified Pulmonary Embolism Severity Index) scoring tools can estimate the mortality of patients. The Geneva prediction rules and Wells criteria are used to calculate the pre-test probability of patients to predict who has a pulmonary embolism. These scores are tools to be used with clinical judgment in deciding diagnostic testing and types of therapy. The PESI algorithm comprises 11 routinely available clinical variables. It puts the subjects into one of five classes (I–V), with 30-day mortality ranging from 1.1% to 24.5%. Those in classes I and II are low-risk and those in classes III–V are high-risk.

== Epidemiology ==
There are roughly 10 million cases of pulmonary embolisms per year. In the United States, pulmonary embolisms are the primary cause of at least 10,000 to 12,000 deaths per year and a contributing cause in at least 30,000 to 40,000 deaths per year. True incidence involving pulmonary embolisms is unknown because they often go undiagnosed or unnoticed until autopsy. From 1993 to 2012, there has been an increase in the number of admissions in hospitals due to pulmonary embolisms, jumping from 23 cases per 100,000 people to 65 cases per 100,000 people. Despite this increase, there has been a decrease in mortality during that same period due to medical advances that have occurred.

Venous thromboembolism (VTE), a common risk factor, is present at much higher rates in those over the age of 70 (three times higher compared to those aged 45 to 69). This is likely due to there being a generally lower level of activity among the elderly, resulting in higher rates of immobility and obesity. VTE has a large, and continuously rising, case fatality rate. This rate is roughly 10% after 30 days, 15% after three months, and up to 20% after one year. Pulmonary embolisms alone (when resulting in hospitalizations) have a case fatality rate of about 5% to 10% so VTE can play a large factor in the severity of the embolisms.

When looking at all cases, the rate of fatal pulmonary emboli has declined from 6% to 2% over the last 25 years in the United States. In Europe, an average of approximately 40,000 deaths per year with pulmonary embolism as the primary cause was reported between 2013 and 2015, a conservative estimate because of potential underdiagnosis.

== See also ==
Cerebral infarction – Stroke resulting from lack of blood flow
