= Westermark sign =

Pattern seen in radiologic examinations

- Differential diagnosis: Hypovolemia
- Named after: Nils Johan Hugo Westermark

In chest radiography, the Westermark sign is a sign that represents a focus of oligemia (hypovolemia) (leading to collapse of vessel) seen distal to a pulmonary embolism (PE). While the chest x-ray is normal in the majority of PE cases, the Westermark sign is seen in 2%.

Essentially, this is a plain X-ray version of a filling defect as seen on computed tomography pulmonary arteriogram.

The sign results from a combination of:

1. the dilation of the pulmonary arteries proximal to the embolus and
2. the collapse of the distal vasculature creating the appearance of a sharp cut off on chest radiography.

== Sensitivity and specificity ==
The Westermark sign, like Hampton's hump (a wedge shaped, pleural based consolidation associated with pulmonary infarction), has a low sensitivity (11%) and high specificity (92%) for the diagnosis of pulmonary embolism. Put more simply, the Westermark sign is seldom seen in pulmonary embolism. When visible on a chest X-ray, the Positive Predictive Value is only 33%. That is, 33% of the time that Westermark sign is seen on Chest XRay does a pulmonary embolism actually exist .

== Etymology ==
It is named after Nils Westermark, a Swedish radiologist.
