= Hampton's line =

Pattern seen in radiologic examinations

- Differential diagnosis: mucosal edema

Hampton's line is a thin, radiolucent line seen across the neck of a gastric ulcer filled with barium sulphate during a barium meal. It is a sign of mucosal edema.

It is named after Aubrey Otis Hampton.
