= Nils Westermark =

Sailor and radiologist

Olympic medal record

Men's Sailing
Silver medal – second place	1912 Stockholm	8 metre class

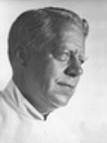
Nils Westermark

Nils Johan Hugo Westermark (September 9, 1892 – January 24, 1980) was a Swedish sailor who competed in the 1912 Summer Olympics. He later became a radiologist, and described the Westermark sign.

He was a crew member of the Swedish boat Sans Atout, which won the silver medal in the 8 metre class.
