= Community Independent School District =

School district in Texas

Location
- Nevada, TX United States of America

District information
- Type: Public
- Motto: Learners Today, Leaders Tomorrow
- Grades: K-12
- Superintendent: Dr. Tonya Knowlton
- School board: Jeff Pendill, Board President, Master Trustee Marc Stanfield, vice president Jana Hunter, secretary Jessica Foster, board member Jeff Cox, board member Sean Walker, board member Josh Saenz, board member
- Governing agency: Texas Education Agency

Students and staff
- Students: 4,143
- Teachers: 267
- District mascot: Braves

Other information
- Website: http://www.communityisd.org/

The Community Independent School District (CISD) is a public school district based in Nevada, Texas, United States. Established in 1947, the district serves students in southeastern Collin County, including the towns of Copeville, Josephine, and Lavon, as well as a small portion of Hunt County.

== History ==
The Community Independent School District was created in 1947 through the consolidation of the Josephine, Lavon, Nevada, Mt. Pisgah, Millwood, and McMinn school districts. Copeville’s district later joined, further expanding the district’s coverage. In 1974, CISD became an independent district.

== Academic achievements ==
In 2009, the Texas Education Agency rated CISD as "academically acceptable".

== Recent developments ==
In recent years, the district has experienced growth due to the increasing population in the Dallas-Fort Worth metropolitan area, which has led to the development of new facilities and the expansion of existing campuses to accommodate the rising number of students.

== Extracurricular activities ==
The district offers a wide range of extracurricular activities, including team and individual sports, music and arts programs, and academic clubs.

== Schools ==
Secondary schools
Name	Grades	Established	Location	Additional information
Community High School	9-12	1947	Nevada	
Community Trails Middle School	6-8	2024	Nevada	
Leland Edge Middle School	6-8	1983	Lavon	

Primary schools
Name	Grades	Established	Location	Additional information
Mary Lou Dodson Elementary School	PK-5	2023	Lavon	
Mildred B. Ellis Elementary School	PK-5	2024	Josephine	
Carylene McClendon Elementary School	PK-5	1998	Nevada	
Phyliss NeSmith Elementary School	PK-5	2008	Lavon	
John and Barbara Roderick Elementary School	PK-5	2002	Josephine	

=== Alternative campuses ===
- Braves Center (Nevada - DAEP Grades 3-12)
