= Lavon, Texas =

- City
- Location of Lavon in Collin County, Texas
- Coordinates: 33°01′31″N 96°26′17″W
- Country: United States
- State: Texas
- County: Collin

Area
  - Total: 3.05 sq mi (7.90 km^{2})
  - Land: 3.04 sq mi (7.88 km^{2})
  - Water: 0.0077 sq mi (0.02 km^{2})
- Elevation: 518 ft (158 m)

Population (2020)
  - Total: 4,469
  - Density: 1,223.9/sq mi (472.56/km^{2})
- Time zone: UTC-6 (Central (CST))
  - Summer (DST): UTC-5 (CDT)
- ZIP code: 75166
- Area codes: 214, 469, 945, 972
- FIPS code: 48-41800
- GNIS feature ID: 2411636
- Website: lavontx.gov

Lavon (/ləˈvɒn/ lə-VON) is a city in Collin County and has been one of the U.S. state of Texas's fastest-growing communities, with a 2000 census-tabulated population of 387 and a 2020 census tabulated population of 4,469.

== Geography ==
Lavon, Texas, is a city located in southeastern Collin County. The city is situated approximately 1 mile (1.6 km) southeast of Lavon Dam on the East Fork of the Trinity River, which forms Lavon Lake, a key recreational and water supply resource for the region. According to the United States Census Bureau, Lavon encompasses a total area of 2.4 square miles (6.1 km²), with 0.01 square miles (0.02 km²), or 0.39%, accounted for by water.

Transportation infrastructure in Lavon includes Texas State Highway 78, which runs through the city, providing direct access northward to Farmersville, located 11 miles (18 km) away, and southwest to Garland, 16 miles (26 km) distant. Additionally, Texas State Highway 205 intersects Highway 78 on the west side of Lavon, extending south for 6 miles (10 km) to Rockwall, facilitating regional connectivity.

Lavon is part of the rapidly growing Dallas-Fort Worth metropolitan area, which has influenced its development and population growth in recent years. As of the most recent census, Lavon has experienced significant residential expansion.

== Demographics ==
Historical population
Census	Pop.	Note	%±
1980	185		—
1990	303		63.8%
2000	387		27.7%
2010	2,219		473.4%
2020	4,469		101.4%
2025 (est.)	11,888		166.0%
U.S. Decennial Census

=== 2020 census ===
As of the 2020 census, Lavon had a population of 4,469. The median age was 33.7 years. 30.7% of residents were under the age of 18 and 8.5% of residents were 65 years of age or older. For every 100 females there were 91.9 males, and for every 100 females age 18 and over there were 89.7 males age 18 and over.

Part of the Metroplex, its population increase is attributed to the rapid influx of residents from other U.S. states and countries.

97.7% of residents lived in urban areas, while 2.3% lived in rural areas.

There were 1,420 households in Lavon, of which 49.4% had children under the age of 18 living in them. Of all households, 68.9% were married-couple households, 9.9% were households with a male householder and no spouse or partner present, and 15.8% were households with a female householder and no spouse or partner present. About 11.2% of all households were made up of individuals and 4.1% had someone living alone who was 65 years of age or older.

There were 1,500 housing units, of which 5.3% were vacant. The homeowner vacancy rate was 4.2% and the rental vacancy rate was 6.1%.

Racial composition as of the 2020 census
Race	Number	Percent
White	2,807	62.8%
Black or African American	580	13.0%
American Indian and Alaska Native	51	1.1%
Asian	203	4.5%
Native Hawaiian and Other Pacific Islander	2	0.0%
Some other race	267	6.0%
Two or more races	559	12.5%
Hispanic or Latino (of any race)	819	18.3%

Of its population from 2000 to 2020, the majority have been non-Hispanic or Latino white Americans. Black and African Americans have remained the second largest racial and ethnic group within the city with Hispanic and Latino Americans.

=== 2000 census ===
At the census of 2000, 387 people, 136 households, and 116 families were residing in the town. In 2000, the median income for a household was $57,083, and for a family was $61,250. Males had a median income of $42,143 versus $31,250 for females. The per capita income for the town was $20,711. None of the families and 1.3% of the population were living below the poverty line, including no one under 18 and 10.5% of those over 64.

=== 2019 American Community Survey ===
The 2019 American Community Survey determined the median household income was $89,474. Married-couple families had a median household income of $95,558, non-married families $96,010, and non-family households $51,625.

== Education ==
Lavon, Texas, is served by the Community Independent School District, which provides educational services to the area. The district encompasses several schools. It plays a significant role in the community, contributing to both the educational development and the overall quality of life in Lavon.
