= Hampton hump =

Pattern seen in radiologic examinations

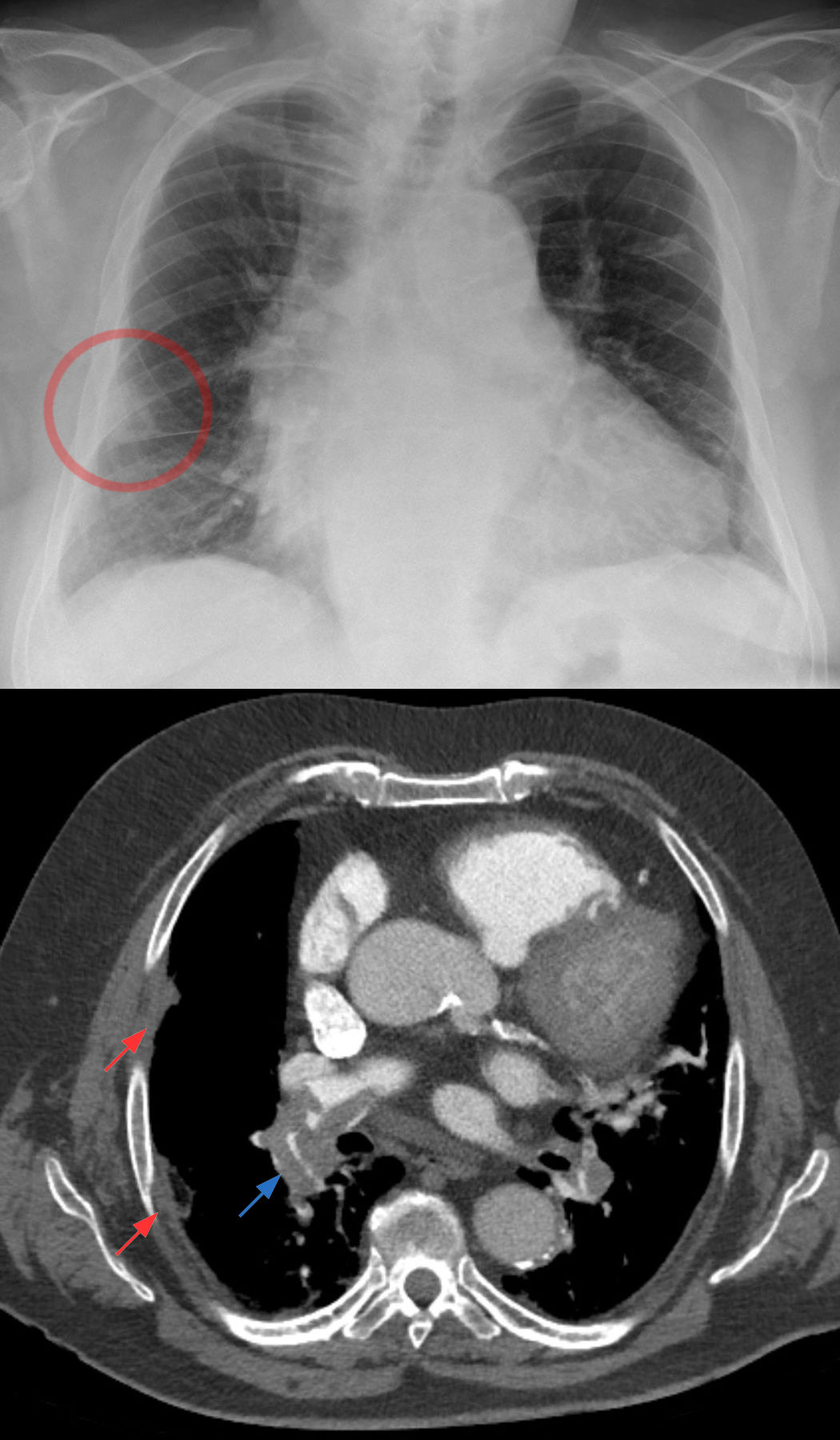
- A Hampton hump in a person with a right low lobe pulmonary embolism shown in CT in the lower image (blue arrow).
- Differential diagnosis: pulmonary embolism

Hampton's hump, also called Hampton hump, is a radiologic sign which consists of a shallow wedge-shaped opacity in the periphery of the lung with its base against the pleural surface. It is named after Aubrey Otis Hampton, who first described it in 1940. Hampton's hump along with Westermark sign may aid in the diagnosis of pulmonary embolism, although they are rare and their sensitivities and interoperator reliabilities are low. If the sign is present in an image, there is a high chance that the person has a pulmonary embolism, but when the sign is absent a pulmonary embolism is not ruled out.
