= Josephine, Texas =

- City
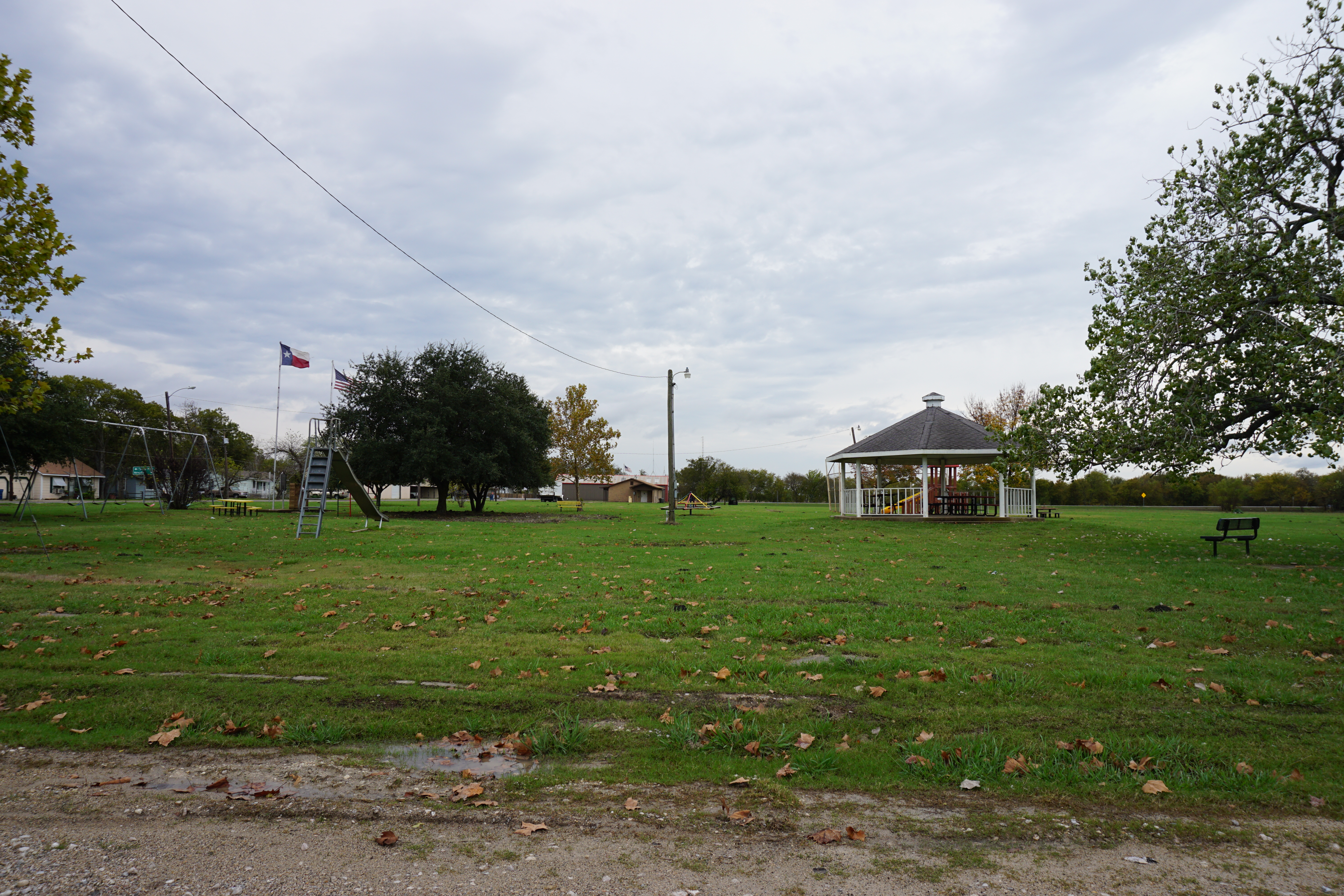
- Josephine City Park
- Interactive map of Josephine, Texas
- Location within Texas Location within the United States
- Coordinates: 33°3′40″N 96°18′26″W
- Country: United States
- State: Texas
- Counties: Collin, Hunt
- Established: 1888
- Incorporated: 1955

Government
  - Type: Mayor–council
  - Mayor: Jason Turney
  - Councilmembers: April Aurand; Jane Ridgway; Alex Esquivel; Pam Sardo; Gary Chappell

Area
  - Total: 2.342 sq mi (6.066 km^{2})
  - Land: 2.134 sq mi (5.527 km^{2})
  - Water: 0.207 sq mi (0.537 km^{2}) 8.88%
- Elevation: 604 ft (184 m)

Population (2020)
  - Total: 2,119
  - Estimate (2025): 10,208
  - Density: 993.0/sq mi (383.4/km^{2})
- Time zone: UTC−6 (Central (CST))
  - Summer (DST): UTC−5 (CDT)
- ZIP Codes: 75135, 75164, 75173, 75189
- Area code(s): 214, 469, 972, and 945
- FIPS code: 48-38068
- GNIS feature ID: 2410151
- Website: cityofjosephinetx.com

Josephine is a city in Collin and Hunt Counties, Texas, United States. The population was 2,119 as of the 2020 census, and was estimated at 10,208 in 2025.

== History ==
The City of Josephine was established in 1888 and was incorporated in 1955.

== Geography ==
According to the United States Census Bureau, the city has a total area of 2.342 square miles (6.07 km^{2}), of which 2.134 square miles (5.53 km^{2}) is land and 0.208 square miles (0.54 km^{2}) (8.88%) is water.

Josephine is located in southeastern Collin County. A small portion extends east into Hunt County. It is 24 miles (39 km) northeast of Garland and 14 miles (23 km) southwest of Greenville.

== Demographics ==
Historical population
Census	Pop.	Note	%±
1960	296		—
1970	296		0.0%
1980	416		40.5%
1990	503		20.9%
2000	594		18.1%
2010	812		36.7%
2020	2,119		161.0%
2025 (est.)	10,208		381.7%
U.S. Decennial Census; 2020 Census

According to realtor website Zillow, the average price of a home as of April 30, 2026, in Josephine is $286,386.

As of the 2024 American Community Survey, there were 1,844 estimated households in Josephine with an average of 3.17 persons per household. The city has a median household income of $91,000. Approximately 5.8% of the city's population lives at or below the poverty line. Josephine has an estimated 64.8% employment rate, with 22.1% of the population holding a bachelor's degree or higher and 88.7% holding a high school diploma. There were 1,954 housing units at an average density of 915.65 per square mile (353.5/km^{2}).

The median age in the city was 33.8 years.

Josephine, Texas – racial and ethnic composition Note: the US Census treats Hispanic/Latino as an ethnic category. This table excludes Latinos from the racial categories and assigns them to a separate category. Hispanics/Latinos may be of any race.
Race / ethnicity (NH = non-Hispanic)	Pop. 2000	Pop. 2010	Pop. 2020	% 2000	% 2010	% 2020
White alone (NH)	519	635	1,390	87.37%	78.20%	65.60%
Black or African American alone (NH)	7	8	125	1.18%	0.99%	5.90%
Native American or Alaska Native alone (NH)	3	2	7	0.51%	0.25%	0.33%
Asian alone (NH)	1	6	22	0.17%	0.74%	1.04%
Pacific Islander alone (NH)	0	0	2	0.00%	0.00%	0.09%
Other race alone (NH)	0	0	11	0.00%	0.00%	0.52%
Mixed race or multiracial (NH)	1	14	117	0.17%	1.72%	5.52%
Hispanic or Latino (any race)	63	147	445	10.61%	18.10%	21.00%
Total	594	812	2,119	100.00%	100.00%	100.00%

=== 2020 census ===
As of the 2020 census, there were 2,119 people, 686 households, and 584 families residing in the city. The population density was 1,172.66 inhabitants per square mile (452.8/km^{2}). There were 702 housing units at an average density of 388.49 per square mile (150.0/km^{2}). The racial makeup of the city was 70.93% White, 5.90% African American, 0.76% Native American, 1.13% Asian, 0.09% Pacific Islander, 8.87% from some other races and 12.32% from two or more races. Hispanic or Latino people of any race were 21.00% of the population.

There were 686 households out of which 53.8% had children under the age of 18 living with them, 66.6% were married couples living together, 15.0% had a female householder with no husband present, and _% were non-families. 11.0% of all households were made up of individuals and 2.7% had someone living alone who was 65 years of age or older. The average household size was 2._ and the average family size was 2._.

In the city the population was spread out with _% under the age of 18, _% from 18 to 24, _% from 25 to 44, _% from 45 to 64, and _% who were 65 years of age or older. The median age was 30.9 years. For every 100 females there were 98.0 males. For every 100 females age 18 and over, there were 96.7 males.

The median income for a household in the city was $_, and the median income for a family was $_. Males had a median income of $_ versus $_ for females. The per capita income for the city was $_. _% of the population and _% of families were below the poverty line. Out of the total people living in poverty, 31.9% were under the age of 18 and 7.9% were 65 or older.

0.0% of residents lived in urban areas, while 100.0% lived in rural areas.

12.4% were households with a male householder and no spouse or partner present.

There were 702 housing units, of which 2.3% were vacant. The homeowner vacancy rate was 0.2% and the rental vacancy rate was 9.9%.

=== 2010 census ===
As of the 2010 census, there were 812 people, 282 households, and 228 families residing in the city. The population density was 433.76 inhabitants per square mile (167.5/km^{2}). There were 316 housing units at an average density of 168.80 per square mile (65.2/km^{2}). The racial makeup of the city was 88.18% White, 0.99% African American, 0.25% Native American, 0.74% Asian, 0.00% Pacific Islander, 7.27% from some other races and 2.59% from two or more races. Hispanic or Latino people of any race were 18.10% of the population.

=== 2000 census ===
As of the 2000 census, there were 594 people, 205 households, and 166 families residing in the city. The population density was 364.49 inhabitants per square mile (140.7/km^{2}). There were 220 housing units at an average density of 135.00 per square mile (52.1/km^{2}). The racial makeup of the city was 92.93% White, 1.18% African American, 0.51% Native American, 0.17% Asian, 0.51% Pacific Islander, 4.21% from some other races and 0.51% from two or more races. Hispanic or Latino people of any race were 10.61% of the population.

There were 205 households, 45.4% had children under 18 living with them, 66.3% were married couples living together, 9.3% had a female householder with no husband present, and 19.0% were not families. About 15.1% of all households were made up of individuals, and 4.9% had someone living alone who was 65 or older. The average household size was 2.90 and the average family size was 3.22.

In the city, the age distribution was 29.1% under 18, 9.8% from 18 to 24, 29.3% from 25 to 44, 24.4% from 45 to 64, and 7.4% who were 65 or older. The median age was 36 years. For every 100 females, there were 111.4 males. For every 100 females 18 and over, there were 106.4 males.

The median income for a household in the city was $34,750, and for a family was $41,250. Males had a median income of $30,625 versus $23,333 for females. The per capita income for the city was $15,879. About 11.1% of families and 12.2% of the population were below the poverty line, including 16.6% of those under age 18 and 4.2% of those age 65 or over.

== Education ==
Josephine is served by the Community Independent School District.
