= Chronic pulmonary aspergillosis =

Fungal infection

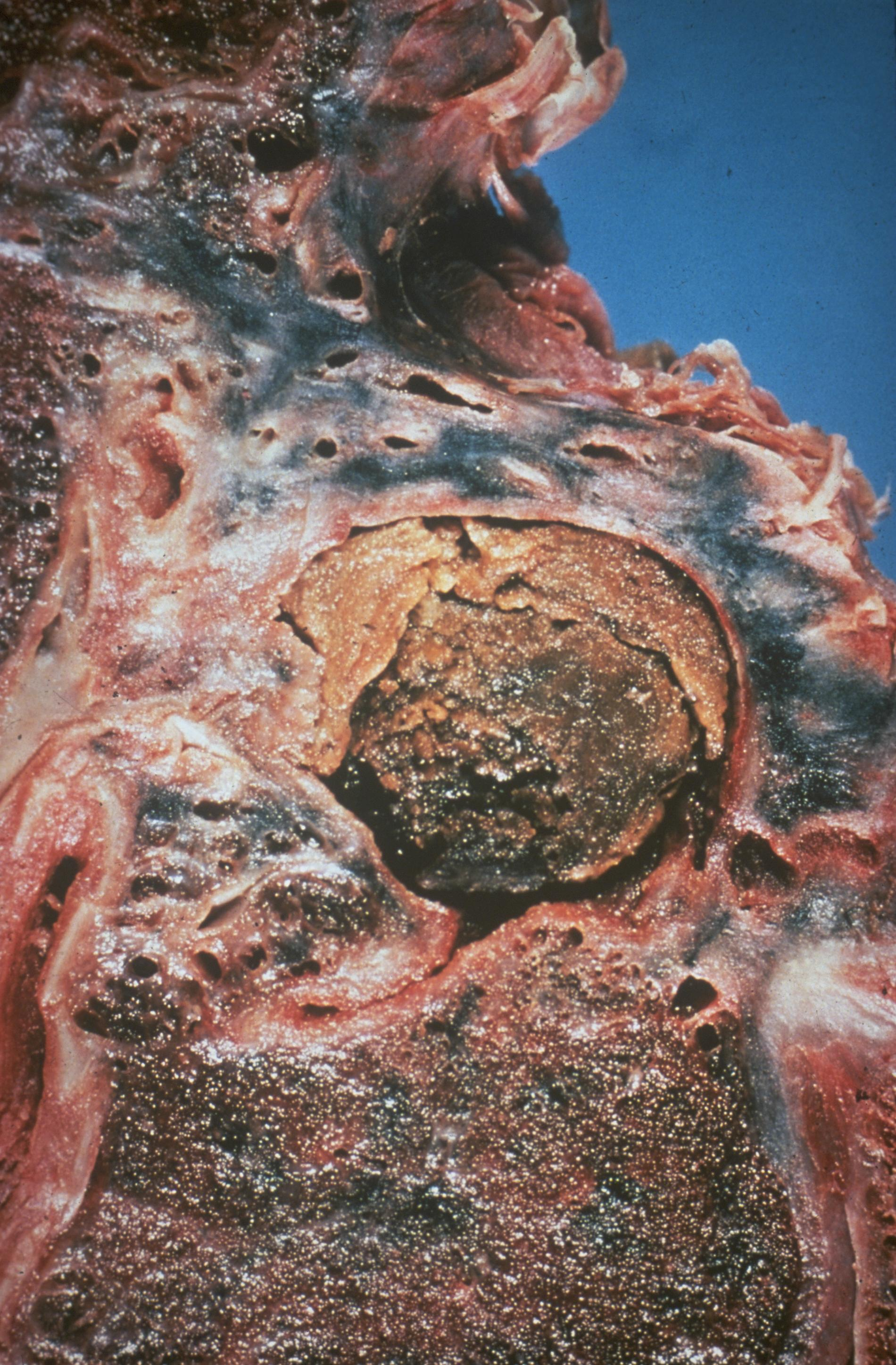
- An example of aspergilloma, one form of chronic pulmonary aspergillosis, following tuberculosis.
- Specialty: Infectious disease
- Symptoms: Weight loss, cough, shortness of breath, haemoptysis, fatigue, malaise, chest pain, sputum production, fever
- Risk factors: Underlying respiratory disease, genetic defects
- Diagnostic method: Via imaging (chest X-ray, high resolution CT scanning)
- Differential diagnosis: Lung cancer, tuberculosis, other fungal infections
- Treatment: Antifungal medications (oral or intravenous), surgery, glucocorticoids
- Prognosis: Approximately 20-40% mortality at 3 years; 50-80% at 7-10 years

Chronic pulmonary aspergillosis is a long-term fungal infection caused by members of the genus Aspergillus—most commonly Aspergillus fumigatus. The term describes several disease presentations with considerable overlap, ranging from an aspergilloma—a clump of Aspergillus mold in the lungs—through to a subacute, invasive form known as chronic necrotizing pulmonary aspergillosis which affects people whose immune system is weakened. Many people affected by chronic pulmonary aspergillosis have an underlying lung disease, most commonly tuberculosis, allergic bronchopulmonary aspergillosis, asthma, or lung cancer.

== Classification ==
Chronic pulmonary aspergillosis as a term encompasses a number of different presentations of varying severity. There is considerable overlap between disease forms which adds to confusion during diagnosis. The primary differentiation comes from radiological findings and serology.

=== Aspergilloma ===
An aspergilloma is a fungus ball composed of Aspergillus hypha - the long filamentous strands which extend from the fungus to enable growth and reproduction. They can arise within any bodily cavity, though in chronic pulmonary aspergillosis they form within pulmonary cavities that have been colonized by Aspergillus spp. If there is a single, stable cavity that provides minimal symptoms, the term 'simple aspergilloma' is commonly used to distinguish it from more severe forms of chronic pulmonary aspergillosis.

=== Aspergillus nodule ===
Aspergillus can form single or multiple nodules which may or may not form a cavity. Whilst usually benign in nature, they can sometimes cause symptoms such as cough or an exacerbation of existing disease such as asthma. Histologically, there is necrosis surrounded by granulomatous inflammation with some multinucleated giant cells present.

=== Chronic cavitary pulmonary aspergillosis ===
When people without immunocompromise undergo formation of one or more pulmonary cavities, this is called chronic cavitary pulmonary aspergillosis. Historically it was also known as "complex aspergilloma" in contrast to a "simple aspergilloma"; this is now considered inaccurate as many cases do not have a visible aspergilloma on imaging. In contrast to aspergilloma and Aspergillus nodules, the vast majority of people with chronic cavitary pulmonary aspergillosis have positive tests for IgG antibodies.

=== Chronic fibrosing pulmonary aspergillosis ===
When chronic cavitary pulmonary aspergillosis is left untreated, it can progress to a form of aspergillosis known as chronic fibrosing pulmonary aspergillosis). As a result of the ongoing inflammation over an extended period of time, extensive fibrosis of the lung parenchyma occurs. This leads to a state known colloquially as "destroyed lung", and has features resembling treated pulmonary tuberculosis.

=== Chronic necrotizing pulmonary aspergillosis ===
Also known as subacute invasive pulmonary aspergillosis, this form of chronic pulmonary aspergillosis leads to progressive features over the course of one to three months—usually in people with some degree of immunocompromise. It is more common in people who are elderly or dependent on alcohol, or with diseases such as diabetes, malnutrition, chronic obstructive pulmonary disease or HIV/AIDS. In contrast to chronic cavitary pulmonary aspergillosis, for example, IgG antibodies for Aspergillus or an antigen called galactomannan may be found in the blood as well as in sputum samples.

== Signs and symptoms ==
People with chronic pulmonary aspergillosis typically present with a prolonged, several month history of unintentional weight loss, chronic cough which is normally productive of sputum, shortness of breath and haemoptysis. One small case series of 18 people found these to be the most common presenting symptoms. Less common symptoms include severe fatigue or malaise, chest pain, sputum production without cough, and fever. Fever would not typically be expected unless they had the subacute invasive subtype. Furthermore, it is possible for less severe subtypes to be asymptomatic. Beyond the direct symptoms, it is possible to have general signs of underlying lung pathology such as digital clubbing—especially when there has been an underlying disease such as tuberculosis or where disease has caused heart failure (known as cor pulmonale).

=== Complications ===
Chronic pulmonary aspergillosis can cause bleeding into the lung parenchyma which can range from mild to life-threatening. If left untreated, as the disease progresses the fungus can spread into the bloodstream causing a state known as fungemia. This widespread infection can distribute fungal spores to other parts of the body, and lead to areas of infarction, and cause haemorrhages.

== Causes ==
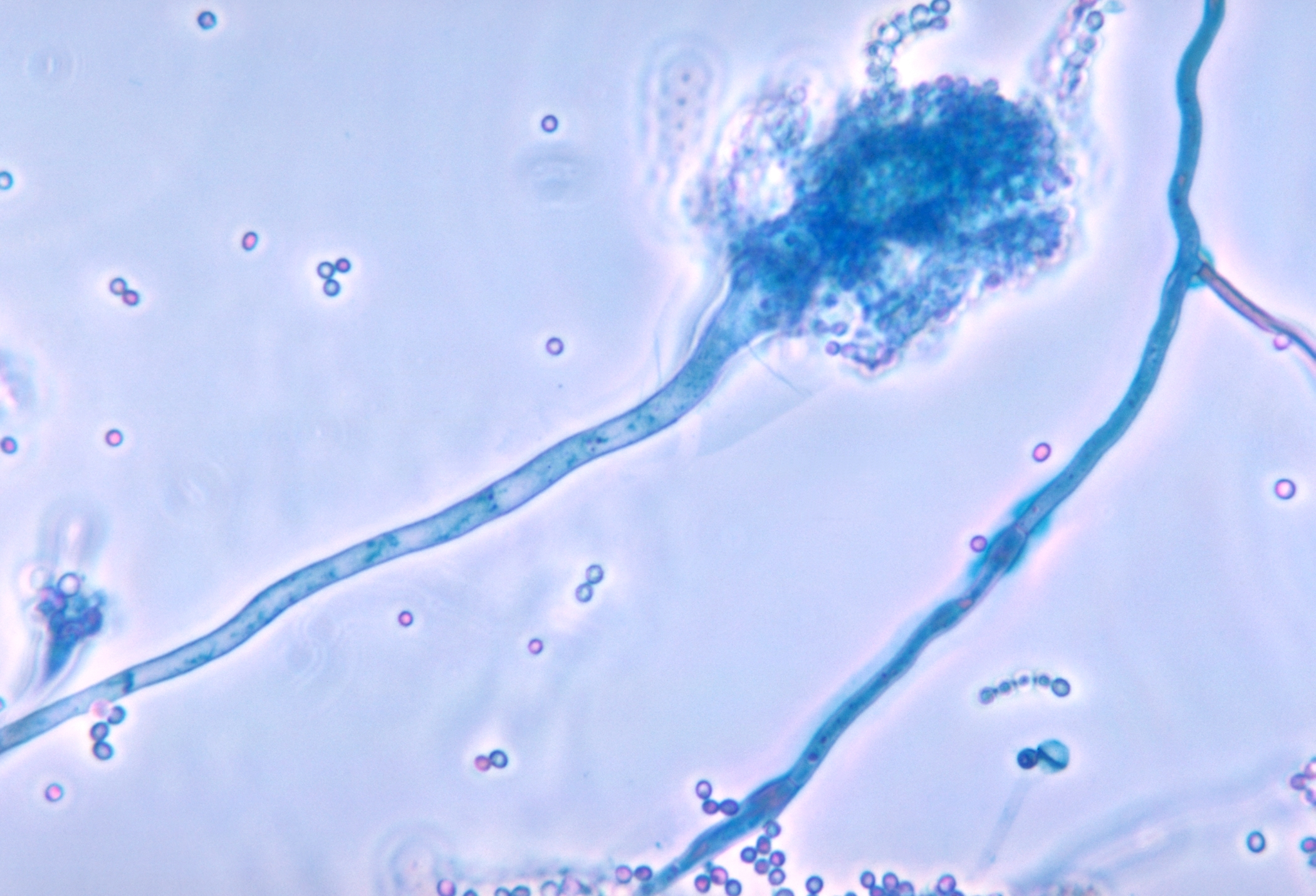
Microscopy showing an Aspergillus fumigatus conidiophore. A. fumigatus is the most common cause of chronic pulmonary aspergillosis.

Aspergillosis is an infection caused by fungi from the genus Aspergillus. The vast majority of cases are caused by Aspergillus fumigatus—a filamentous fungus found ubiquitously on every continent including Antarctica. Other species of Aspergillus include A. flavus and A. terreus.

The major risk factors for chronic pulmonary aspergillosis are previous cavity formation from other respiratory conditions. Examples include collapsed lungs which have formed bullae, chronic obstructive lung disease, lung cancer, and fibrocavitary sarcoidosis. Another risk factor is immunosuppression; most commonly, this includes allogeneic stem cell transplantation, prolonged neutropaenia, immunosuppressive drug therapy, chronic granulomatous disease and haematological malignancies. Certain demographics are also at higher risk, including the elderly, male sex and those with a low body mass index.

There appears to be increasing evidence for complex genetic factors increasing the risk of developing chronic pulmonary aspergillosis, such as defects to toll-like receptor (TLR) 4, IL1 and IL15, TLR3, TLR10, TREM1, VEGFA, DENND1B, and PLAT.

== Mechanism ==
The full underlying pathogenesis is not completely understood. Most people with chronic pulmonary aspergillosis have functional immune status, but usually have underlying structural damage to the lungs from an underlying process or disease. Most commonly, pre-existing pulmonary cavities from other diseases such as tuberculosis become colonised with Aspergillus conidia which have been inhaled—humans inhale between 1,000 and 10 billion spores per day, of which A. fumigatus is the most common.

Aspergillomas themselves usually form in existing cavities but the cavities may form directly from chronic pulmonary aspergillosis. People with pulmonary tuberculosis with a cavity larger than 2 cm appear to have a 20% increased risk of developing chronic pulmonary aspergillosis.

It is postulated that conidia, once inhaled, are attacked by the host immune defences—specifically phagocytes and alveolar macrophage resident in the small airways. It is unknown whether these defences are sufficient to clear conidia or whether they are directly responsible for the inflammation leading to chronic pulmonary aspergillosis. Some Aspergillus have the ability to inhibit phagocyte nicotinamide adenine dinucleotide phosphate oxidase activation which is one of the core defence systems against filamentous fungi, which may increase susceptibility of the host to chronic pulmonary aspergillosis.

== Diagnosis ==
Tomosynthesis of the lungs of a woman who previously had aspergillosis, showing scarring consistent with chronic fibrosing pulmonary aspergillosis.

The diagnosis of chronic pulmonary aspergillosis is often initially considered when patients present with a history of unintentional weight loss and fatigue. Confirmation of this suspicion is normally achieved with a combination of radiological imaging and serological testing, with the goal of excluding other diagnoses like tuberculosis and finding evidence of fungus present. Whilst cavities seen on chest X-rays can raise suspicion, positive IgG testing for Aspergillus is required for confirmation.

Sputum samples can be sent for culture, but where these return negative patients should undergo bronchoscopy and bronchoalveolar lavage for further culture samples. Concurrent infections with non-tuberculous mycobacteria, or atypical infections such as MRSA or Pseudomonas aeruginosa are common and these can also form cavities.

To confirm the presence of an aspergilloma, there needs to be radiological evidence of a round mass in the lungs with confirmatory evidence either from culture or IgG testing. The distinction between simple aspergilloma, and more advanced chronic cavitary pulmonary aspergillosis, will depend on the severity of inflammation, radiological evidence, and changes over time. To confirm chronic pulmonary aspergillosis, the current criteria is one large cavity or more than two small cavities, either with or without aspergilloma. This must be accompanied by at least one symptom of fever, weight loss, fatigue, cough, sputum production, haemoptysis or shortness of breath for at least 3 months. Furthermore, as with aspergilloma, there must be positive IgG testing but this can be with or without culture. To confirm Aspergillus nodules as opposed to aspergilloma, these must be seen directly on imaging or confirmed by percutaneous or surgical biopsy.

The fibrosing form—chronic fibrosing pulmonary aspergillosis—has similar criteria to chronic cavitary pulmonary aspergillosis but will be accompanied by significant fibrosis seen on either biopsy, tomosynthesis, or high resolution computed tomography.

If chronic pulmonary aspergillosis has progressed to subacute invasive pulmonary aspergillosis, there must be a degree of immunosuppression. The microbiological criteria are similar to those of invasive aspergillosis but normally slower in progression, i.e. months rather than weeks. Furthermore, there must be evidence of IgG or galactomannan in the blood and a confirmatory biopsy of affected tissue.

== Treatment ==
People with single aspergillomas generally do well with surgery to remove the aspergilloma, and are best given pre-and post-operative antifungal medications. Often, no treatment is necessary; however, if a person coughs up blood (haemoptysis), treatment may be required using surgery or injection of dye to locate the bleeding combined with embolisation using chemicals or tiny material meant to block the bleeding blood vessel. Studies of tranexamic acid for treating haemoptysis do not provide strong evidence for long-term benefit.

For chronic cavitary pulmonary aspergillosis and chronic fibrosing pulmonary aspergillosis, lifelong use of antifungal medications is commonplace. Itraconazole and voriconazole are first- and second-line antifungal agents respectively. Posaconazole or isavuconazole can be used as third-line agent for people with chronic pulmonary aspergillosis who are intolerant of or developed resistance to the first- and second-line agents. Regular chest X-rays, serological and mycological parameters, and quality of life questionnaires are used to monitor treatment progress. It is important to monitor the blood levels of antifungals to ensure optimal dosing as individuals vary in their absorption levels of these medications.
