= Crescent sign =

In radiology, the crescent sign is any of several findings named for a crescent-shaped appearance on imaging:

- Crescent sign (bone), a curved subchondral radiolucent line on radiographs in avascular necrosis (osteonecrosis), usually indicating impending collapse of the affected bone.
- Air crescent sign, a crescent of air between a mass and the wall of a lung cavity on chest radiograph or CT, classically caused by an aspergilloma.
- High-attenuation crescent sign, a high-density crescent within the wall or mural thrombus of an abdominal aortic aneurysm on CT, regarded as a sign of acute or impending rupture.
- Crescent sign (aorta): In arterial dissection, the intramural hematoma of a carotid or vertebral artery appears as a crescent-shaped area of high signal on fat-saturated T1-weighted MRI.
- Crescent sign (brain): A CT sign of subdural hematoma where the bleeding has a cresentric appearance due to its trackning along the cerebral convexities.
