= Galactosaminogalactan =

Galactosaminogalactan (commonly abbreviated as GAG or GG), is an exopolysaccharide composed of galactose and N-acetylgalactosamine (GalNAc). It is commonly found in the biofilm and cell wall of various fungal species. Although the sugar residues are arranged in no particular/discrete order, and thus a heteroglycan, the residues are all linked by α-1,4 glycosidic bonds. Galactosaminogalactan is typically extracted by ethanol precipitation from liquid culture or by alkaline treatment from the cell wall. Once extracted, galactosaminogalactan becomes highly insoluble.

In Aspergillus fumigatus, a causative agent of aspergillosis, galactosaminogalactan is required for adherence to host tissue, to mask PAMPs like β-1,3-glucans and to mediate virulence in several animal models. While its role in pathogenesis is still being defined, galactosaminogalactan has been found in histological sections of lungs of patients with aspergillosis. Besides its role in fungal virulence, certain fractions of laboratory purified galactosaminogalactan has been shown to induce neutrophil apoptosis and reduce inflammation.

== Synthesis ==
Similar to other fungal cell wall polysaccharides, galactosaminogalactan is synthesized by polymerization of nucleotide sugars. Although the actual glycosyltransferase responsible for polymerization has not been reported, the synthesis of precursor nucleotide sugars has been studied. The galactose component originates from UDP-galactose and the GalNAc component originates from UDP-N-acetylgalactosamine. These nucleotide sugars are not physiologically favored and must to be converted from UDP-glucose and Uridine diphosphate N-acetylglucosamine (GlcNAc), respectively. The UDP-glucose 4-epimerase Uge3 is responsible for these conversions.
