= DENND1B =

Human gene

Identifiers
- Aliases: DENND1B, C1ORF18, C1orf218, FAM31B, DENN domain containing 1B
- External IDs: OMIM: 613292; MGI: 2447812; GeneCards: DENND1B
Available structures
| PDB | Ortholog search: PDBe RCSB |
| PDB | List of PDB id codes 3TW8 |

Gene location (Human)
| Chr. | Chromosome 1 (human) |
| Band | 1q31.3 | Start | 197,504,748 bp |
| Band | 1q31.3 | End | 197,775,696 bp |

Gene location (Mouse)
| Chr. | Chromosome 1 (mouse) |
| Band | 1|1 E4 | Start | 138,891,173 bp |
| Band | 1|1 E4 | End | 139,106,698 bp |
RNA expression pattern
| Bgee | Human / Mouse (ortholog); Top expressed in: jejunal mucosa; right ventricle; mucosa of colon; mucosa of paranasal sinus; bone marrow cell; mucosa of sigmoid colon; renal medulla; buccal mucosa cell; oral cavity; trabecular bone / Top expressed in: lymph node; mesenteric lymph nodes; utricle; epithelium of lens; blood; retinal pigment epithelium; Paneth cell; epithelium of small intestine; spermatid; vastus lateralis muscle; More reference expression data |
| BioGPS | n/a |
Gene ontology
| Molecular function | guanyl-nucleotide exchange factor activity; phosphatidylinositol phosphate binding |
| Cellular component | cytoplasm; cytoplasmic vesicle; clathrin-coated vesicle; cytosol; nuclear speck; intracellular membrane-bounded organelle |
| Biological process | protein transport; T-helper 2 cell cytokine production; positive regulation of GTPase activity; T cell receptor signaling pathway; regulation of immune response; endocytic recycling; endocytosis |
Sources:Amigo / QuickGO
Orthologs
| Databases | NCBI: entry; OMA: entry |
| Species | Human | Mouse |
| Entrez | 163486 | 329260 |
| Ensembl | ENSG00000213047 | ENSMUSG00000056268 |
| UniProt | Q6P3S1 | Q3U1T9 |
| RefSeq (mRNA) | NM_001142795; NM_001195215; NM_001195216; NM_001300858; NM_019049 NM_144977 | NM_001166501; NM_181347; NM_183217 |
| RefSeq (protein) | NP_001182144; NP_001182145; NP_001287787; NP_659414 | NP_001159973; NP_851992 |
| Location (UCSC) | Chr 1: 197.5 – 197.78 Mb | Chr 1: 138.89 – 139.11 Mb |
| PubMed search |
- Wikidata
| View/Edit Human | View/Edit Mouse |

DENN domain-containing protein 1B is a protein encoded by DENND1B human gene, located on chromosome 1.

== Structure ==
The protein has tripartite DENN domain at N-terminal.

== Functions ==
The protein is a guanine nucleotide exchange factor for RAB35.

== Clinical significance ==
The gene is hypothesized by Danish scientists Klaus Bønnelykke and Hans Bisgaard to be related to asthma. The gene may affect susceptibility to chronic cavitary pulmonary aspergillosis. Variants of this gene are also associated with obesity in both humans and dogs.
