= Primary cutaneous aspergillosis =

- Specialty: Dermatology

Primary cutaneous aspergillosis is a rare skin condition most often occurring at the site of intravenous cannulas in immunosuppressed patients.

== See also ==
- Aspergillosis
