= Allergic bronchopulmonary aspergillosis =

- Other names: ABPA, Hinson-Pepys disease.
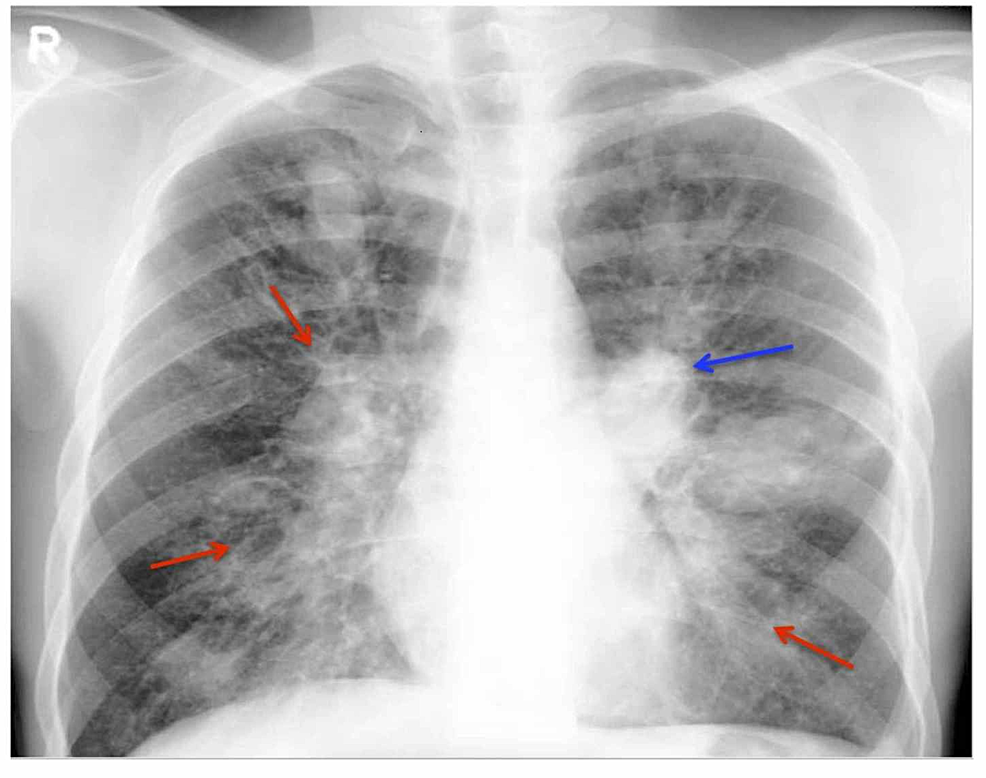
- The chest radiograph of an allergic bronchopulmonary aspergillosis patient shown with left-sided perihilar opacity (blue arrow) along with non-homogeneous infiltrates (transient pulmonary infiltrates indicated by red arrows) in all zones of both lung fields.
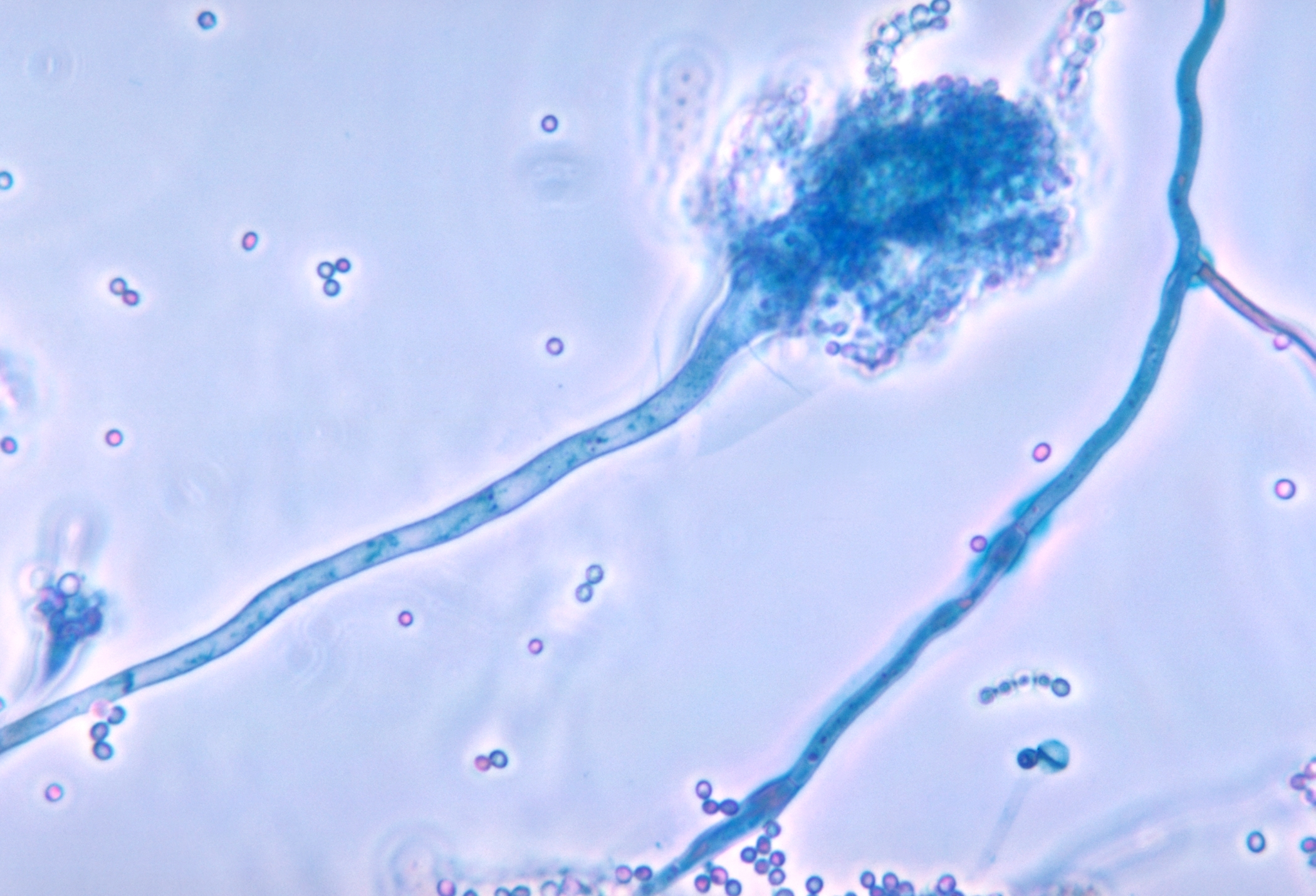
- The conidiophore of the fungal organism Aspergillus fumigatus.
- Specialty: Pulmonology, Infectious disease
- Symptoms: wheezing, coughing, shortness of breath and exercise intolerance.
- Complications: Asthma exacerbations, aspergilloma, chronic pulmonary aspergillosis, cavitation, local emphysema, chronic or recurrent atelectasis, and honeycomb fibrosis.
- Causes: Aspergillus exposure.
- Risk factors: Asthma or cystic fibrosis.
- Diagnostic method: Chest X-rays, CT scans, blood tests, immunological tests, and sputum cultures.
- Differential diagnosis: Asthma with fungal sensitivity, cystic fibrosis, bronchiectasis, eosinophilic pneumonia, eosinophilic granulomatosis with polyangiitis, bronchocentric granulomatosis, tuberculosis, and sarcoidosis.
- Prevention: Corticosteroids and antifungal medications.
- Medication: Prednisolone and Itraconazole.
- Frequency: 1–15% of cystic fibrosis patients and 2.5% of adults with severe asthma.

Allergic bronchopulmonary aspergillosis (ABPA) is a condition characterised by an exaggerated response of the immune system (a hypersensitivity response) to the fungus Aspergillus including Aspergillus niger, Aspergillus fumigatus, Aspergillus versicolor, and Aspergillus terrus.It occurs most often in people with asthma or cystic fibrosis. Aspergillus spores are ubiquitous in soil and are commonly found in the sputum of healthy individuals. A. fumigatus is responsible for a spectrum of lung diseases known as aspergilloses.

ABPA causes airway inflammation, leading to bronchiectasis—a condition marked by abnormal dilation of the airways. Left untreated, the immune system and fungal spores can damage sensitive lung tissues and lead to scarring.

The exact criteria for the diagnosis of ABPA are not agreed upon. Chest X-rays and CT scans, raised blood levels of IgE and eosinophils, immunological tests for Aspergillus together with sputum staining and sputum cultures can be useful. Treatment consists of corticosteroids and antifungal medications.

== Signs and symptoms ==
Almost all patients have clinically diagnosed asthma, and present with wheezing (usually episodic in nature), coughing, shortness of breath and exercise intolerance (especially in patients with cystic fibrosis). Moderate and severe cases have symptoms suggestive of bronchiectasis, in particular thick sputum production (often containing brown mucus plugs), as well as symptoms mirroring recurrent infection such as pleuritic chest pain and fever. Patients with asthma and symptoms of ongoing infection, who do not respond to antibiotic treatment, should be suspected of ABPA.

== Pathophysiology ==
Aspergillus spores are small (2–3 μm in diameter) and can penetrate deep into the respiratory system to the alveolar level. In healthy people, innate and adaptive immune responses are triggered by various immune cells (notably neutrophils, resident alveolar macrophages and dendritic cells) drawn to the site of infection by numerous inflammatory cytokines and neutrophilic attractants (such as CXCR2 receptor ligands). In this situation, mucociliary clearance is initiated and spores are successfully phagocytosed, clearing the infection from the host.

In people with predisposing lung diseases—such as persistent asthma or cystic fibrosis (or rarer diseases such as chronic granulomatous disease or Hyper-IgE syndrome)—several factors lead to an increased risk of ABPA. These include immune factors (such as atopy or immunogenic HLA-restricted phenotypes), as well as genetic factors (such as CFTR gene mutations in both asthmatics and cystic fibrosis patients and a ZNF77 mutation resulting in a premature stop codon in asthmatics and ABPA patients). By allowing Aspergillus spores to persist in pulmonary tissues, it permits successful germination which leads to hyphae growing in mucus plugs.

There are hypersensitivity responses, both a type I response (atopic, with the formation of immunoglobulin E, or IgE) and a type III hypersensitivity response (with the formation of immunoglobulin G, or IgG). The reaction of IgE with Aspergillus antigens results in mast cell degranulation with bronchoconstriction and increased capillary permeability. Immune complexes (a type III reaction) and inflammatory cells are deposited within the mucous membranes of the airways, leading to necrosis (tissue death) and eosinophilic infiltration. Type 2 T helper cells appear to play an important role in ABPA due to an increased sensitivity to interleukin (IL) 4 and IL-5. These cytokines up-regulate mast cell degranulation, exacerbating the respiratory decline.

Aspergillus also uses several factors to continue evading host responses, notably the use of proteolytic enzymes that interrupt IgG antibodies aimed towards it. Another important feature is its ability to interact and integrate with epithelial surfaces, which results in massive pro-inflammatory counter-response by the immune system involving IL-6, IL-8 and MCP-1 (a CCL2 receptor ligand). Proteases released by both the fungus and neutrophils induce further injury to the respiratory epithelium, leading to initiation of repair mechanisms (such as an influx of serum and extracellular matrix (ECM) proteins) at the site of infection. Aspergillus spores and hyphae can interact with ECM proteins, and it is hypothesised that this process facilitates the binding of spores to damaged respiratory sites.

As concentrations of Aspergillus proteases increase, the immunological effect switches from pro-inflammatory to inhibitory, and further reduces phagocytic ability to clear Aspergillus. Ultimately, repeated acute episodes lead to wider-scale damage of pulmonary structures (parenchyma) and function via irreversible lung remodelling. Left untreated, this manifests as progressive bronchiectasis and pulmonary fibrosis that is often seen in the upper lobes, and can give rise to a similar radiological appearance to that produced by tuberculosis.

== Diagnosis ==
The exact criteria for the diagnosis of ABPA are not yet universally agreed upon, though working groups have proposed specific guidelines. Minimal criteria include five factors: the presence of asthma and/or cystic fibrosis, a positive skin test to Aspergillus sp., total serum IgE > 416 IU/mL (or kU/L), an increased Aspergillus species–specific IgE and IgG antibodies, and the presence of infiltrates on a chest X-ray.

ABPA should be suspected in patients with a predisposing lung disease—most commonly asthma or cystic fibrosis— and is often associated with chronic airway limitation (CAL). Patients generally present with symptoms of recurrent infection such as fever, but do not respond to conventional antibiotic therapy. Poorly controlled asthma is a common finding, with a case series only finding 19% of ABPA patients with well-controlled asthma. Wheezing and hemoptysis (coughing up blood) are common features, and mucus plugging is seen in 31–69% of patients.

=== Blood tests and serology ===
The first stage involves exposing the skin to Aspergillus fumigatus antigens; an immediate reaction is the hallmark of ABPA. The test should be performed first by skin prick testing, and if negative followed with an intradermal injection. The overall sensitivity of the procedure is around 90%, though up to 40% of asthmatic patients without ABPA can still show some sensitivity to Aspergillus antigens (a phenomenon likely linked to a less severe form of ABPA termed severe asthma with fungal sensitization (SAFS)).

Serum blood tests are an important marker of disease severity and are also useful for the primary diagnosis of ABPA. When serum IgE is normal (and patients are not being treated by glucocorticoid medications), ABPA is excluded as the cause of symptoms. A raised IgE increases suspicion, though there is no universally accepted cut-off value. Values can be stated in international units (IU/mL) or ng/mL, where 1 IU is equal to 2.4 ng/mL. Since studies began documenting IgE levels in ABPA during the 1970s, various cut-offs between 833 and 1000 IU/mL have been employed to both exclude ABPA and to warrant further serological testing. The current consensus is that a cut-off of 1000 IU/mL should be employed, as lower values are encountered in SAFS and asthmatic sensitization.

IgG antibody precipitin testing from serum is useful, as positive results are found in between 69 and 90% of patients, though also in 10% of asthmatics with and without SAFS. Therefore, it must be used in conjunction with other tests. Various forms exist, including enzyme-linked immunosorbent assay (ELISA) and fluorescent enzyme immunoassay (FEIA). Both are more sensitive than conventional counterimmunoelectrophoresis. IgG may not be entirely specific for ABPA, as high levels are also found in chronic pulmonary aspergillosis (CPA) alongside more severe radiological findings.

Until recently, peripheral eosinophilia (high eosinophil counts) was considered partly indicative of ABPA. More recent studies show that only 40% of people with ABPA present with eosinophilia, and hence a low eosinophil count does not necessarily exclude ABPA; for example, patients undergoing steroid therapy have lower eosinophil counts.

=== Radiological investigation ===
Consolidation and mucoid impaction are the most commonly described radiological features described in ABPA literature, though much of the evidence for consolidation comes from before the development of computed tomography (CT) scans. Tramline shadowing, finger-in-glove opacities, and 'toothpaste shadows' are also prevalent findings.

When using high-resolution CT scans, there can be a better assessment of the distribution and pattern of bronchiectasis within the lungs, and hence this is the tool of choice in the radiological diagnosis of ABPA. Central (confined to medial two-thirds of the medial half of the lung) bronchiectasis that peripherally tapers bronchi is considered a requirement for ABPA pathophysiology, though in up to 43% of cases, there is a considerable extension to the periphery of the lung.

Mucoid impaction of the upper and lower airways is a common finding. Plugs are hypodense but appear on CT with high attenuation (over 70 Hounsfield units) in up to 20% of patients. Where present it is a strong diagnostic factor of ABPA and distinguishes symptoms from other causes of bronchiectasis.

CT scans may more rarely reveal mosaic-appearance attenuation, centrilobular lung nodules, tree-in-bud opacities, and pleuropulmonary fibrosis (a finding consistent with CPA, a disease with ABPA as a known precursor). Rarely other manifestations can be seen on CT scans, including military nodular opacities, perihilar opacities (that mimic hilar lymphadenopathy), pleural effusions and pulmonary masses. Cavitation and aspergilloma are rarer findings, not exceeding 20% of patients, and likely represent a shift from ABPA to CPA if accompanied by pleural thickening or fibrocavitary disease.

=== Culture ===
Culturing fungi from sputum is a supportive test in the diagnosis of ABPA, but is not 100% specific for ABPA as A. fumigatus is ubiquitous and commonly isolated from lung expectorant in other diseases. Nevertheless, between 40 and 60% of patients do have positive cultures depending on the number of samples taken.

=== Staging ===
New criteria by the ABPA Complicated Asthma ISHAM Working Group suggest 6-stage criteria for the diagnosis of ABPA, though this is yet to be formalised into official guidelines. This would replace the current gold standard staging protocol devised by Patterson and colleagues. Stage 0 would represent an asymptomatic form of ABPA, with controlled asthma but still fulfilling the fundamental diagnostic requirements of a positive skin test with elevated total IgE (>1000 IU/mL). Stage 6 is an advanced ABPA, with the presence of type II respiratory failure or pulmonary heart disease, with radiological evidence of severe fibrosis consistent with ABPA on a high-resolution CT scan. It must be diagnosed after excluding the other, reversible causes of acute respiratory failure.

== Treatment ==
The underlying disease must be controlled to prevent exacerbation and worsening of ABPA, and in most patients, this consists of managing their asthma or CF. Any other co-morbidities, such as sinusitis or rhinitis, should also be addressed.

Hypersensitivity mechanisms, as described above, contribute to the progression of the disease over time and, when left untreated, result in extensive fibrosis of lung tissue. To reduce this, corticosteroid therapy is the mainstay of treatment (for example with prednisone); however, studies involving corticosteroids in ABPA are limited by small cohorts and are often not double-blinded. Despite this, there is evidence that acute-onset ABPA is improved by corticosteroid treatment as it reduces episodes of consolidation. There are challenges involved in long-term therapy with corticosteroids—which can induce severe immune dysfunction when used chronically, as well as metabolic disorders—and approaches have been developed to manage ABPA alongside potential adverse effects from corticosteroids.

The most commonly described technique, known as sparing, involves using an antifungal agent to clear spores from airways adjacent to corticosteroid therapy. The antifungal aspect aims to reduce fungal causes of bronchial inflammation, while also minimising the dose of corticosteroid required to reduce the immune system's input to disease progression. The strongest evidence (double-blinded, randomized, placebo-controlled trials) is for itraconazole twice daily for four months, which resulted in significant clinical improvement compared to placebo, and was mirrored in CF patients. Using itraconazole appears to outweigh the risk from long-term and high-dose prednisone. Newer triazole drugs—such as posaconazole or voriconazole—have not yet been studied in-depth through clinical trials in this context.

While the benefits of using corticosteroids in the short term are notable, and improve quality of life scores, there are cases of ABPA converting to invasive aspergillosis while undergoing corticosteroid treatment. Furthermore, in concurrent use with itraconazole, there is potential for drug interaction and the induction of Cushing syndrome in rare instances. Metabolic disorders, such as diabetes mellitus and osteoporosis, can also be induced.

To mitigate these risks, corticosteroid doses are decreased biweekly assuming no further progression of disease after each reduction. When no exacerbations from the disease are seen within three months after discontinuing corticosteroids, the patient is considered to be in complete remission. The exception to this rule is patients who are diagnosed with advanced ABPA; in this case, removing corticosteroids almost always results in exacerbation and these patients are continued on low-dose corticosteroids (preferably on an alternate-day schedule).

Serum IgE can be used to guide treatment, and levels are checked every 6–8 weeks after steroid treatment commences, followed by every 8 weeks for one year. This allows for a determination of baseline IgE levels, though it's important to note that most patients do not entirely reduce IgE levels to baseline. Chest X-ray or CT scans are performed after 1–2 months of treatment to ensure infiltrates are resolving.

== Epidemiology ==
There are limited national and international studies into the burden of ABPA, made more difficult by non-standardized diagnostic criteria. Estimates of between 0.5 and 3.5% have been made for ABPA burden in asthma, and 1–17.7% in CF. Five national cohorts, detecting ABPA prevalence in asthma (based on GINA estimates), were used in a recent meta-analysis to produce an estimate of the global burden of ABPA complicating asthma. From 193 million people with asthma worldwide, ABPA prevalence in asthma is estimated to be between 1.35 and 6.77 million people, using 0.7–3.5% attrition rates. A compromise at 2.5% attrition has also been proposed, placing the global burden at around 4.8 million people affected. The Eastern Mediterranean region had the lowest estimated prevalence, with a predicted case burden of 351,000; collectively, the Americas had the highest predicted burden at 1,461,000 cases. These are likely underestimates of total prevalence, given the exclusion of CF patients and children from the study, as well as diagnostic testing being limited in less developed regions.
