= Air crescent sign =

Pattern seen in radiologic examinations

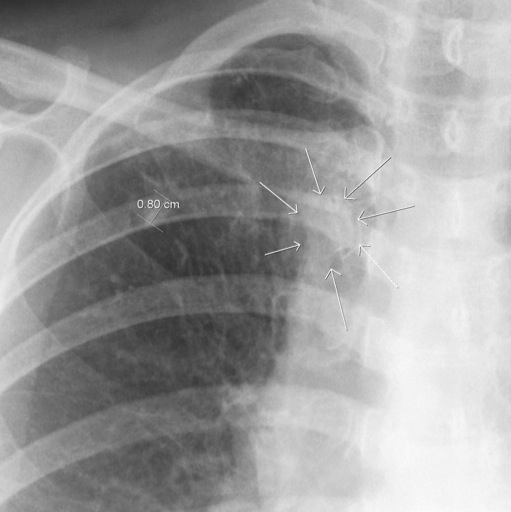
- The arrows denote an ill-defined nodular opacity in the medial aspect of the right upper lobe with an ill-defined rim of lucency surrounding it.
- Differential diagnosis: Aspergilloma

In radiology, the air crescent sign (also called the Monad sign) is a finding on chest radiograph and computed tomography that is crescenteric and radiolucent, due to a lung cavity that is filled with air and has a round radiopaque mass. Classically, it is due to an aspergilloma, a form of aspergillosis, that occurs when the fungus Aspergillus grows in a cavity in the lung.

Air crescent sign has also been reported in conditions such as tuberculosis, granulomatosis with polyangiitis, intracavitary hemorrhage, and lung cancer.

== Additional images ==
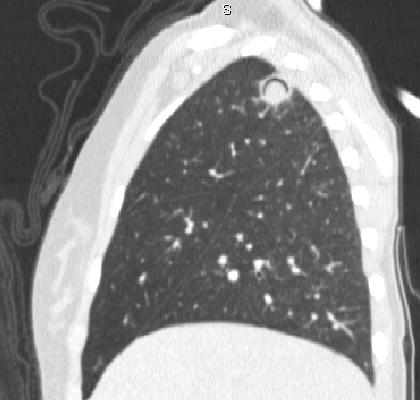
Sagittal reformat from a CT scan of the chest showing air crescent sign in a patient with invasive fungal infection. There is a rounded cavity in the apical right upper lobe, with a non-dependent soft-tissue nodule within it. Also, there is some subtle ground-glass opacity surrounding the lesion.
