= High-attenuation crescent sign =

Pattern seen in radiologic examinations

High attenuation crescent sign or hyperdense crescent sign is a radiologic sign indicating impending aortic rupture. It is seen as a curvilinear area paralleling the vessel wall of the aorta. The hyperdense area is due to intramural or mural thrombus haemorrhage. The blood that dissects through mural thrombosis or wall of the aneurysm causes weakening of the wall. This is of relatively high density compared to the psoas muscle in contrast-enhanced CT and greater than the aorta in non-contrast CT imaging.
