= Tomosynthesis =

Medical imaging technique

Tomosynthesis of a lung with chronic fibrosing pulmonary aspergillosis

Tomosynthesis, also digital tomosynthesis (DTS), is a method for performing high-resolution limited-angle tomography at radiation dose levels comparable with projectional radiography. It has been studied for a variety of clinical applications, including vascular imaging, dental imaging, orthopedic imaging, mammographic imaging, musculoskeletal imaging, and chest imaging.

== History ==
The concept of tomosynthesis was derived from the work of Ziedses des Plantes, who developed methods of reconstructing an arbitrary number of planes from a set of projections. Though this idea was displaced by the advent of computed tomography, tomosynthesis later gained interest as a low-dose tomographic alternative to CT.

== Reconstruction ==
Tomosynthesis reconstruction algorithms are similar to CT reconstructions, in that they are based on performing an inverse Radon transform. Due to partial data sampling with very few projections, approximation algorithms have to be used. Filtered back projection and iterative, expectation-maximization algorithms have both been used to reconstruct the data.

Reconstruction algorithms for tomosynthesis are different from those of conventional CT because the conventional filtered back projection algorithm requires a complete set of data. Iterative algorithms based upon expectation maximization are most commonly used, but are computationally intensive. Some manufacturers have produced practical systems using off-the-shelf GPUs to perform the reconstruction in a few seconds.

== Differences from other imaging modalities ==
Digital tomosynthesis combines digital image capture and processing with simple tube/detector motion as used in conventional computed tomography (CT). However, though there are some similarities to CT, it is a separate technique. In modern (helical) CT, the source/detector makes at least a complete 180-degree rotation about the subject obtaining a complete set of data from which images may be reconstructed. Digital tomosynthesis, on the other hand, only uses a limited rotation angle (e.g., 15–60 degrees) with a lower number of discrete exposures (e.g., 7–51) than CT. This incomplete set of projections is digitally processed to yield images similar to conventional tomography with a limited depth of field. Because the image processing is digital, a series of slices at different depths and with different thicknesses can be reconstructed from the same acquisition. However, since fewer projections are needed than CT to perform the reconstruction, radiation exposure and cost are both reduced.

== Applications ==
=== Breast ===
Digital breast tomosynthesis (DBT) is Food and Drug Administration (FDA) approved for use in breast cancer screening. The benefit for screening has been debated, but consensus is being reached that the technology is improving sensitivity compared to two-view digital mammography while recall rates seem to be debated in different studies. Because the data acquired are 85–160 micron typical resolution, much higher than CT, digital breast tomosynthesis is unable to offer the narrow slice widths that CT offers (typically 1–1.5 mm). However, the higher resolution detectors permit very high in-plane resolution, even if the Z-axis resolution is less. Another interesting property of breast tomosynthesis is that image quality may vary substantially through the imaging volume. Digital breast tomosynthesis reading times are much higher, compared to mammography interpretation.

Normal mammograms had been criticized for having too many false negatives and false positives. the fact that mammography had only two views (usually CC and MLO) limited the ability of the radiologists to identify findings. On the other hand, other scans types are not a good fit for screening. for example, Breast Ultrasound or Breast MRI are very accurate, but take too much time and cannot be used for screening, CT scans can give the radiologist much more data, but also have much more radiation which might have adverse effect, and thus should not be done for screening, where most of the population is healthy.

Therefore tomosynthesis benefits both from low dose compared to a full CT scan, and contains much more data than a regular mammogram. Nevertheless it poses a new challenge as the time usually spent by radiologists for reading mammograms is very short, and reading Tomosynthesis may take more time

Moreover, because of the number of high-definition slices, the DBT studies are much larger in storage size, taking about half a Gigabyte, and sometimes even up to a full Gigabyte, compared to around 50-100 Megabytes of traditional Mammograms. this makes the networking, compression and decompression much slower, which poses an additional challenge for radiologists' speed of reading, especially when comparison studies (history studies) are also loaded.

Photon-counting breast tomosynthesis has been investigated, and spectral imaging applications, such as breast density measurement and lesion characterization, have been investigated on that platform.

=== Musculoskeletal imaging ===
Tomosynthesis has a much more limited depth of field than does CT. For this reason, it likely will not be able to replace CT for the evaluation of the deeper organs of the body. However, since bones are often near the skin, multiple musculoskeletal applications of tomosynthesis have been studied, most of which have mostly been used in research with limited use in everyday practice.

==== Evaluation of fractures ====
Tomosynthesis has been compared to both radiography and CT for the evaluation of healing fractures, especially in the presence of hardware. In a study of patients with wrist fractures, digital tomosynthesis was shown to enable detection of more fractures than radiography while simultaneously providing lower metal artifact than radiography.

==== Evaluation of erosions in rheumatoid arthritis ====
Tomosynthesis has been compared to digital radiography, with CT as the standard, for the detection of erosions associated with rheumatoid arthritis. The radiation dose of digital tomosynthesis was very close to that of digital radiography. However, tomosynthesis showed sensitivity, specificity, accuracy, positive predictive value, and negative predictive value of 80%, 75%, 78%, 76%, and 80%, compared to digital radiography were 66%, 81%, 74%, 77%, and 71%. The slight benefit digital tomosynthesis in this application may or may not justify the slightly increased cost of the modality compared to digital radiography.

=== Electronics ===
Tomosynthesis is also used for x-ray inspection of electronics, particularly printed circuit board assemblies and electronic components. Tomosynthesis is usually used where a CT slice is required at high magnification, where conventional CT would not allow the sample to be located close enough to the x-ray source.

== Manufacturers of Tomosynthesis machines ==
Well-known Tomosynthesis machines include:

- Hologic Selenia dimensions - The first FDA approved Tomosynthesis machine, in 2011
- GE SenoClaire, first approved by the FDA on 2014
- Siemens Mammomat, first approved by the FDA on 2016
- Fujifilm Aspire, first approved by the FDA on 2017
