= Aspergilloma =

- Other names: Mycetoma, fungus ball, moldy lungs
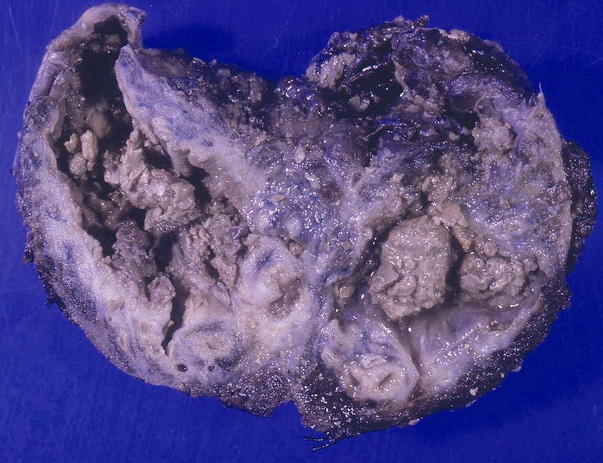
- Aspergillomas complicating tuberculosis: multiple aspergillomas within large cavitary lesions of tuberculous origin.
- Specialty: Infectious disease
- Causes: Aspergillus fungal infection
- Diagnostic method: Chest x-ray show tumour like opacity. Serology can be helpful. Fungal hyphae seen on KoH mount and sputum culture grows fungus
- Frequency: Patients with CPA: 25%; Global 5-year period prevalence: 18 in 100,000

A pulmonary aspergilloma, also known as chronic pulmonary aspergillosis, is a human infectious disease of the lung caused by the colonization of a cavity by a fungus of the genus Aspergillus, most commonly Aspergillus fumigatus. The spores are transmitted through the air and are not contagious between individuals. It is a frequent complication of tuberculous cavities, which are themselves the primary sequelae of pulmonary tuberculosis, and correspond to localized lung tissue destruction. The cavities of pulmonary tubercles are poorly equipped to defend against Aspergillus infection, allowing the fungus to proliferate and form a pseudo-tumor that partially fills the cavity. It is estimated that more than 370,000 people worldwide develop an aspergilloma each year.

Several forms of aspergilloma exist, with varying severity and symptoms depending on the patient's overall health. Aspergillomas are distinguished from other Aspergillus infections by their localized nature. They are categorized based on their size and the degree of underlying lung destruction. The primary complication is bleeding, which leads to expectoration of blood, sometimes life-threatening. Diagnosis is based on a combination of radiological findings and fungal identification. Treatment is either medical, using antifungals, or surgical.

== History ==
The genus Aspergillus was first described in 1729 by Italian botanist Pier Antonio Micheli. The first description of a human aspergilloma is attributed to John Hughes Bennett in 1842, though this attribution has been questioned. In 1847, Theodor Sluyter reported the first confirmed case of diffuse human aspergillosis, and in 1855, German physician Friedrich Küchenmeister provided the first autopsy description of an aspergilloma developed in an excavated bronchial carcinoma. Aspergillomas in tuberculous cavities were first described in 1856. Their radiological description was not established until 1938, and lesion classification was refined in 1952. The first antifungal treatment trials began in 1959, and surgical treatment was developed in the same decade.

== Overview ==
=== Causative organisms ===
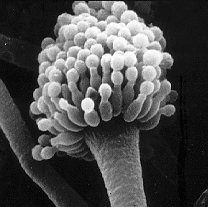
Aspergillus fumigatus under electron microscopy.

Aspergillus fumigatus is a saprophytic soil fungus, highly prevalent, and one of the most prolific spore producers in the air. Its spores, measuring 2–3 μm in diameter, are small enough to reach the pulmonary alveoli and numerous enough that humans inhale several hundred daily. These spores are typically cleared by the immune system and only become pathogenic under certain conditions.

While all fungi in the Aspergillus genus are potentially pathogenic (e.g., Aspergillus flavus, Aspergillus terreus, Aspergillus niger, and Aspergillus nidulans), Aspergillus fumigatus accounts for 90% of human pulmonary infections. These infections are categorized into several types: allergic bronchopulmonary aspergillosis, invasive aspergillosis, and aspergilloma. Unlike diffuse infections such as invasive aspergillosis and allergic bronchopulmonary aspergillosis, aspergillomas are localized infections characterized by fungal growth within a cavity. Aspergillus sinusitis is another form, where the fungus develops in a natural sinus cavity of the face.

=== Predisposing conditions ===
While diffuse Aspergillus infections typically affect immunocompromised patients, colonization of a pulmonary cavity leading to aspergilloma formation primarily occurs in immunocompetent individuals with underlying chronic lung disease. Aspergillomas are not contagious between humans, as transmission occurs via inhaled air.

Aspergillomas predominantly develop in tuberculous cavities; between 17% and 25% of patients with such cavities also have an aspergilloma. Since the 1980s, this proportion has decreased in Europe. In 2010, 15% of UK patients with aspergilloma had a history of pulmonary tuberculosis, compared to 93% in Korea. Other, less common mycobacterial infections also predispose to aspergillomas.

While the frequency of tuberculous cavities has decreased in developed countries by the late 20th century due to improved management of pulmonary tuberculosis, some tuberculosis patients remain at high risk. Globally, tuberculosis remains the primary risk factor for aspergillomas in the early 21st century, particularly in cases of global immune deficiency or lung destruction. Aspergillomas are the main sequelae of pulmonary tuberculosis: in 2007, 7.7 million people worldwide had pulmonary tuberculosis, with an estimated 372,000 developing at least one aspergilloma, primarily in Southeast Asia, the Pacific, and Africa. Aspergillomas in these patients are often underdiagnosed, mistaken for non-bacillary pulmonary tuberculosis or pulmonary fibrosis. Any tuberculosis patient with hemoptysis should be considered to have an aspergilloma.

Beyond tuberculosis, other lung diseases can lead to cavity formation where aspergillomas may develop. In HIV-positive patients, pneumocystosis is the second most significant risk factor after tuberculosis. In immunocompetent patients, chronic obstructive pulmonary disease, emphysema, and bronchial dilation are the main risk factors apart from tuberculosis. Pulmonary sarcoidosis, though rare, is complicated by aspergilloma in about 6% of cases. Major thoracic surgeries (lobectomy, pneumonectomy, or parietectomy with lung resection) also increase risk. Approximately 3.6% of patients undergoing lobectomy for lung cancer develop an aspergilloma months or years later.

== Pathophysiology ==
=== Formation of tuberculous cavities ===
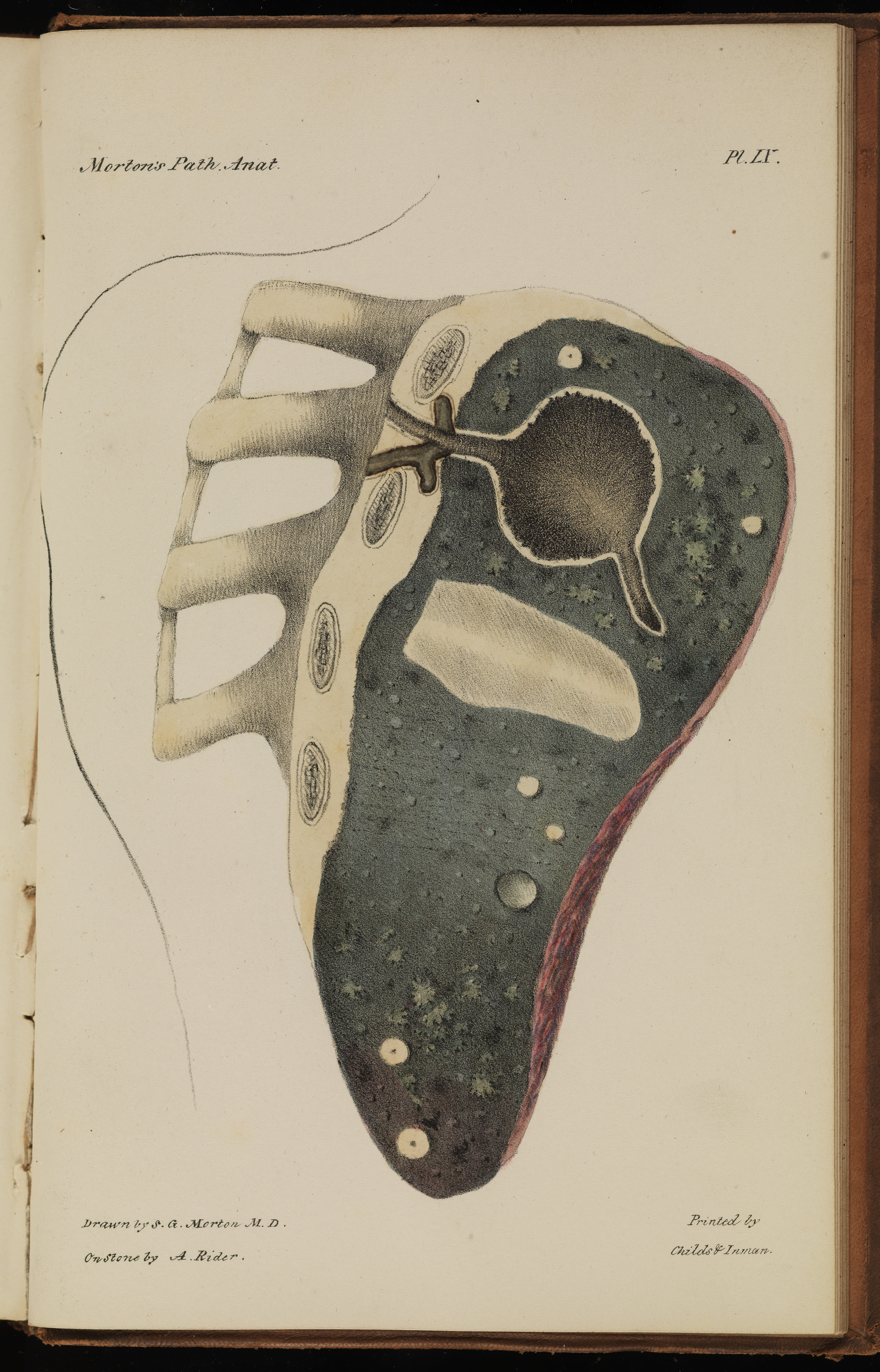
Illustration of a tuberculous cavity communicating with a bronchus.

A cavity is a hollow space within the lung parenchyma. Cavities are a common complication of pulmonary tuberculosis, appearing after primary infection.

Tuberculous bacilli initially form nodules called granulomas, which are surrounded by lymphocytes and macrophages to contain the infection. Granulomas may resolve without scarring or progress to cavities, though the underlying mechanisms are not fully understood. The remnants of destroyed macrophages form the bulk of caseous necrosis at the granuloma's center. In some patients, this necrosis liquefies, creating an environment conducive to bacilli proliferation. Proteolytic enzymes erode the fibrous capsule surrounding the granuloma, and the liquid center may drain, replaced by air from the bronchi. When a tuberculous cavity communicates with the bronchial tree, bacilli dissemination in exhaled air increases contagiousness. The high bacilli load in cavities also promotes resistance to anti-tuberculous drugs. Once the liquefied necrosis is cleared, the granuloma's periphery persists around an empty, infection-prone cavity.

=== Composition of an aspergilloma ===
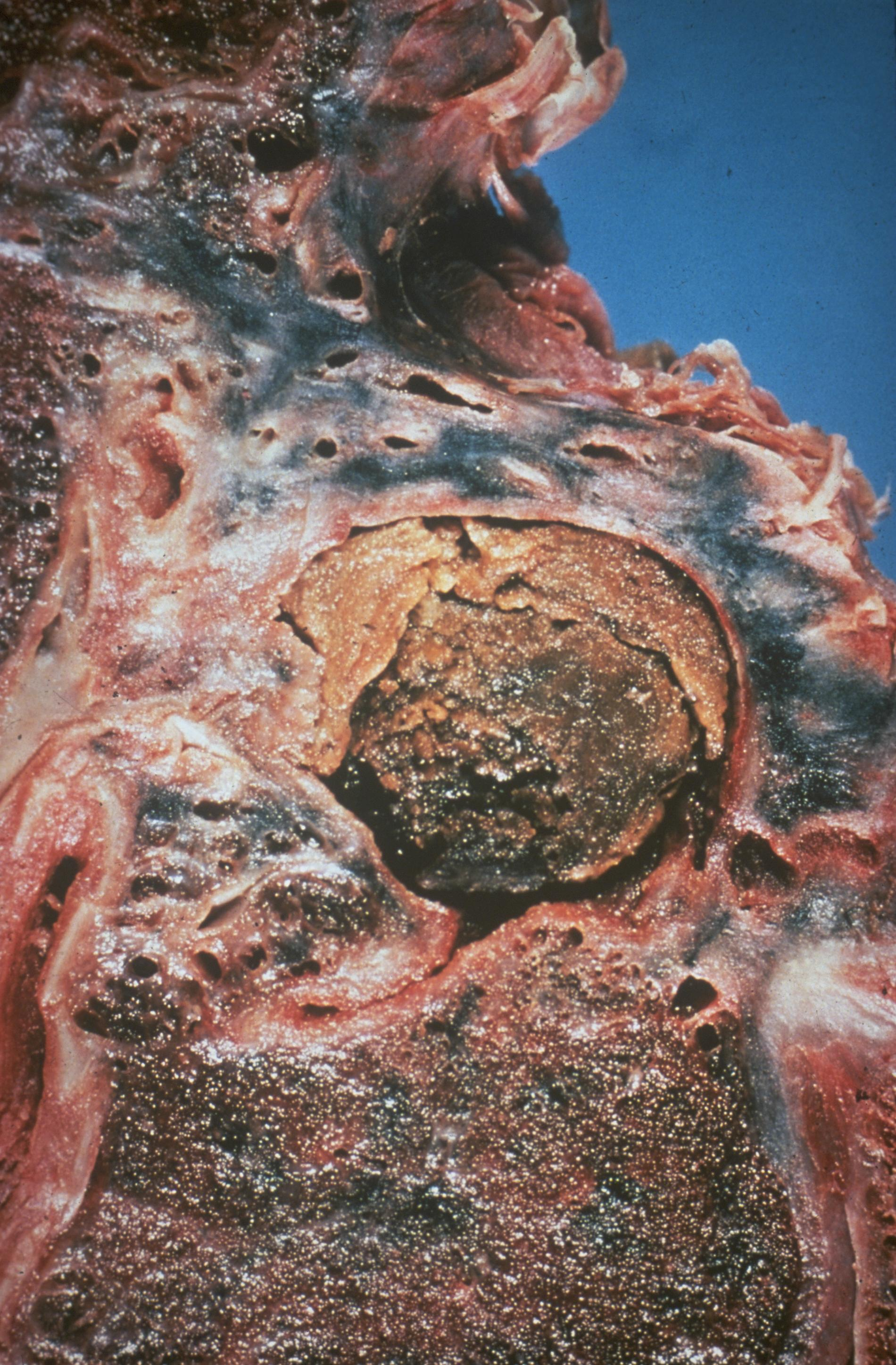
Aspergilloma showing the typical brownish appearance within a well-defined cavity.

An aspergilloma appears as a spherical pseudo-tumor, often termed an "aspergillar ball" or "aspergillar truffle". It consists of fungal filaments (mycelium and hyphae) embedded in a proteinaceous polysaccharide matrix. Sporulating structures line the aspergilloma.

Several clinical forms of chronic pulmonary aspergillosis exist, which may overlap:

- Simple pulmonary aspergilloma, where a typical aspergilloma is suspended in a lung cavity, often asymptomatic, with no radiological progression over 3 months, and sometimes negative serology;
- Complex pulmonary aspergilloma (or chronic cavitary pulmonary aspergilloma), where one or more cavities contain aspergillomas, with clinical symptoms and radiological progression;
- Chronic pulmonary aspergillosis with fibrosis, where at least two lung lobes are destroyed by a complex aspergilloma;
- Aspergillar nodule, where the aspergilloma forms in healthy parenchyma rather than a cavity;
- Subacute invasive aspergillosis, in immunocompromised patients, where invasive aspergillosis progresses over months, creating cavities and nodules.

Simple aspergillomas are usually solitary, though multiple or bilateral forms exist. In immunocompromised patients, aspergillomas develop throughout the lung, while in immunocompetent individuals, they are more often found at the apex of the upper lobes or the apical segment of the lower lobes. There is a continuum of progression between aspergilloma types. Progression is favored by immunosuppression, particularly uncontrolled HIV infection.

=== Mechanism of aspergilloma formation ===
The mechanisms underlying aspergilloma formation are poorly understood and remain debated.

Spore adhesion to the respiratory epithelium, forming a biofilm, is the first step. Spores in contact with bronchial epithelium and alveoli produce enzymes, particularly proteases, that degrade nearby tissue proteins, especially elastin and collagen. Contact with spores causes epithelial desquamation and the release of pro-inflammatory cytokines. Locally produced interleukins contribute to aspergilloma formation, with certain genetic variations promoting complex aspergillomas, alongside the host's genetic immune profile. The resulting desquamation and inflammation reduce the epithelial barrier's effectiveness, facilitating Aspergillus infection.

== Clinical manifestations ==
Aspergillomas are often asymptomatic, discovered incidentally on a chest X-ray or computed tomography performed for other reasons.

Hemoptysis (pulmonary or bronchial bleeding manifesting as bloody sputum) is the most common clinical sign. It affects 54–87% of patients and is massive in 10% of cases. The mechanism triggering bronchial vessel erosion is poorly understood; it may be mechanical, due to the aspergillar mass rubbing against the cavity wall, or chemical, due to local toxin production. Some suggest that anastomoses between bronchial and pulmonary vessels may contribute. The risk of hemoptysis becomes significant when the cavity exceeds 2 cm in diameter.

Another common symptom is a productive wet cough. Other symptoms (fatigue, chronic dry cough, weight loss, fever) are non-specific and may relate to the underlying lung disease, making it difficult to attribute them solely to the aspergilloma.

The annual mortality rate for aspergilloma patients is 5–6%. Up to 26% of patients die from massive hemoptysis.

== Diagnostic investigations ==
=== Mycological diagnosis ===
==== Pathogen identification ====
Identifying the specific Aspergillus strain can be achieved through various methods. Testing sputum samples is often uninformative due to the high abundance of spores in the air, which can contaminate samples. Sputum analysis should include at least three separate samples to increase the likelihood of identifying the pathogen. Identification via bronchial fibroscopy is far more specific; direct examination looks for mycelial filaments, and culture seeks the strain itself. Cultures are grown on Sabouraud agar with antibiotics or malt extract agar incubated at 30 °C.

Molecular detection via PCR is more sensitive than culture and requires only one sample. Biopsy of lesions, typically surgical or via EBUS, offers the highest sensitivity and specificity for mycological diagnosis but is more invasive.

Galactomannan, a complex sugar produced by the fungus, can be detected in sputum. Its antigen may also be detectable in blood.

Immunologically, the A. fumigatus antigen can be sought in sputum. The presence of anti-Aspergillus antibodies in blood, detected via serology, is critical for diagnosis. Serology distinguishes recent from past infections and differentiates simple bronchial colonization from true infection. A negative serology can rule out an aspergilloma in doubtful cases.

==== Antifungal resistance ====
Once the strain is identified in culture, testing its sensitivity to antifungals is recommended. Multiple strains with differing sensitivities may coexist in a single patient.

The emergence of Aspergillus resistance to antifungals began in the late 1990s; the first reported case was in 1997. In the Netherlands, resistance rates rose from 2.5% in 2000 to 4.9% in 2002, 6.6% in 2004, and 10% by 2009. Resistance is geographically heterogeneous, primarily affecting Western Europe and Scandinavia. It mainly involves triazoles, the first-line recommended antifungal class.

Initially, resistance developed during treatment. Since 2008, resistance in patients never treated with antifungals has been reported, indicating resistance spread in wild Aspergillus fumigatus populations. Resistance is primarily linked to mutations in the target protein of triazoles, the lanosterol 14α-demethylase enzyme, encoded by the cyp51A gene. Resistant strains are typically resistant to multiple triazoles. Since 2010, other resistance mechanisms have emerged.

Antifungal resistance is concerning due to the limited availability of antifungals, reducing treatment options, particularly as triazoles are the only oral antifungals. However, the risk of global resistance spread is low.

=== Imaging ===
On chest X-ray, a simple aspergilloma appears as a dense nodule, often surrounded by an air crescent. X-ray alone is insufficient for diagnosis; a CT scan is recommended. On thoracic CT, the cavity's center is occupied by the aspergilloma. The pseudo-tumor shifts within the cavity with patient movement (Monod sign). In simple aspergillomas, there is no progression between exams, and the cavity wall is typically thin. Complex aspergillomas show thick-walled cavities (or multiple cavities) containing an aspergillar truffle, sometimes with early pulmonary fibrosis. The adjacent pleura may appear fibrosed, with slow but progressive radiological worsening. A ground-glass halo may surround the lesions.

CT imaging appearance

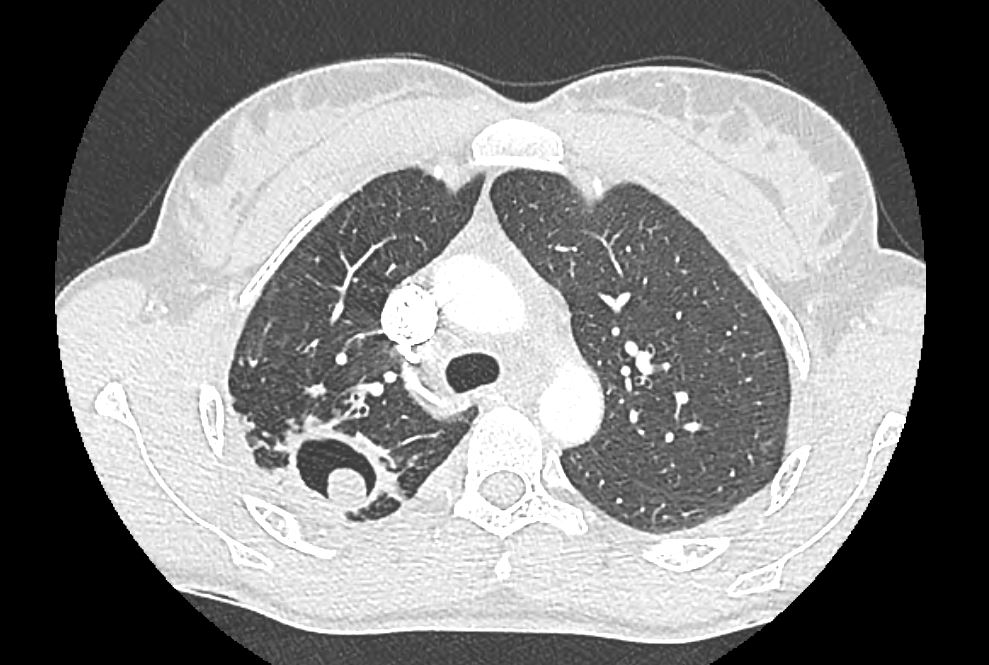
Typical CT appearance of an aspergilloma in a tuberculous cavity.

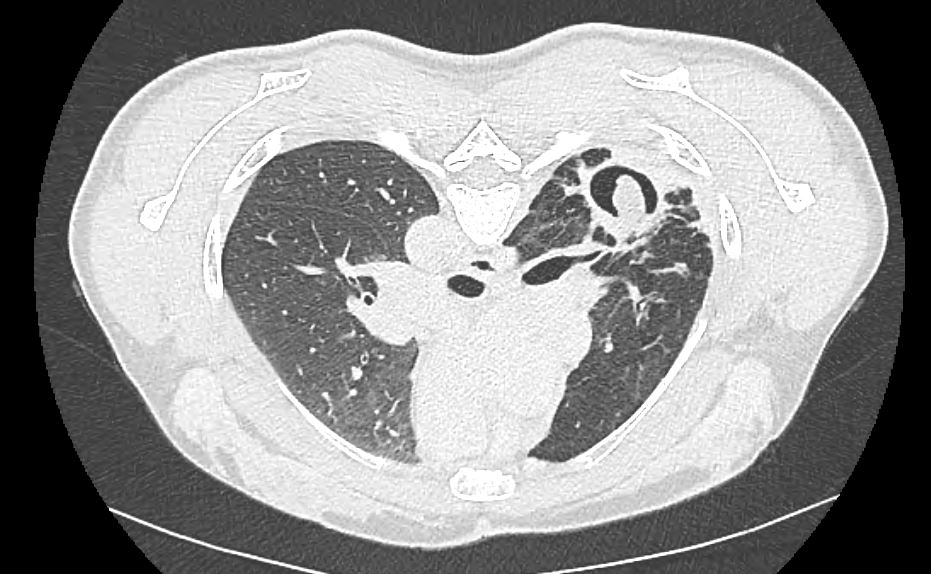
Position change alters the aspergillar ball's position in the cavity (Monod sign).

Radiological diagnosis alone is inadequate, as other lesions (e.g., excavated lung cancer, lung abscess, or hydatid cyst) may appear similar. Injection of iodinated contrast to visualize vessels can detect a Rasmussen aneurysm, a pseudo-aneurysmal dilation of the pulmonary artery near a cavity, at risk of rupture causing massive, often fatal hemoptysis.

PET scans are not useful for aspergilloma diagnosis, as they consistently show hyperfixation and are a differential diagnosis for excavated lung cancers.

=== Diagnostic approach ===
Aspergilloma diagnosis relies on a combination of findings: consistency between CT imaging and mycological diagnosis after ruling out other possibilities. If radiological findings are typical, serology alone confirms the diagnosis in over 90% of cases. If serology is negative, fungal presence must be confirmed by other means (culture or PCR): sputum analysis, bronchoalveolar lavage, or biopsy. Other infectious diseases, such as histoplasmosis, coccidioidomycosis, and active pulmonary tuberculosis, must be excluded. Concurrent bacterial infections (e.g., Streptococcus pneumoniae, Haemophilus influenzae, Staphylococcus aureus, Pseudomonas aeruginosa, or anaerobes) do not rule out aspergilloma.

As a localized infection, aspergillomas do not trigger a systemic immune response, so there is no inflammatory syndrome or elevated white blood cell count.

== Treatment ==
Various medical societies have issued guidelines on management, though consensus is not always clear. Managing aspergillomas is complex due to patients' compromised health, particularly pre-existing respiratory insufficiency from tuberculosis or chronic bronchitis. Treatment is multidisciplinary, involving infectious disease specialists, thoracic surgeons, and pulmonologists.

=== Antifungal treatment ===
Itraconazole, a member of the triazole class, is recommended as the first-line treatment. In cases of intolerance, treatment failure, or fungal resistance, voriconazole (also a triazole) or posaconazole may be considered as alternatives. Special attention must be paid to drug interactions caused by triazoles, which affect the activity of other medications due to their role as enzyme inhibitors.

Oral administration of triazoles stabilizes lesions and reduces the risk of massive hemoptysis, typically with minimal side effects. The response to treatment is slow, requiring 4 to 6 months of therapy, or even 9 months in some cases. In patients who respond well to treatment after this duration but are not eligible for surgery, treatment may be extended for several months or even years. Patients whose condition is only stabilized may benefit from long-term treatment, as discontinuation can sometimes lead to worsening symptoms.

Intravenous treatment is typically reserved for patients with rapidly progressing forms or in cases of triazole failure (due to resistance or poor tolerance). Amphotericin B, micafungin, and caspofungin, which are alternatives to triazoles, are only available via injection. An intravenous induction phase followed by oral triazoles is also an option. Even short-term treatment with amphotericin B requires close monitoring of renal function.

If initial antifungal treatment fails, other progressive diseases, particularly a recurrence of tuberculosis, should be investigated. Since antituberculous treatments can induce resistance to azoles, this possibility must also be ruled out.

The use of antifungal therapy alongside surgical intervention is debated. There appears to be no survival benefit or reduction in recurrence rates. However, postoperative antifungal treatment is recommended for immunocompromised patients and those with incomplete surgical resection. No specific treatment duration is recommended; it should be determined on a case-by-case basis. Some experts suggest a minimum total treatment duration of six months.

== Surgical indications ==
Surgery is one of the curative treatments for aspergilloma. It aims to remove all aspergilloma lesions and can range from simple segmental resection (for simple aspergillomas) to lobectomy or pneumonectomy for complex aspergillomas.

For simple aspergillomas, surgery is recommended as the first-line treatment due to low complication rates and the potential for cure. When pulmonary function permits, surgery is the standard treatment. However, some experts suggest that asymptomatic simple aspergillomas should be monitored without antifungal or surgical intervention. For complex aspergillomas, surgical management is primarily indicated in cases of hemoptysis, with lifelong antifungal therapy preferred whenever possible. Surgical procedures for complex aspergillomas are challenging and risky, with recurrence rates reaching up to 25%. Success, defined as the absence of recurrence, depends on complete resection without opening the aspergilloma, which could seed the cavity, and the lung's ability to fully reoccupy the pleural cavity without residual detachment.

Major pulmonary resections, particularly pneumonectomies, have higher complication rates for infectious causes compared to cancer. Complication rates for pulmonary resections for aspergilloma are higher in patients with tuberculous cavities than in those who are simply immunocompromised. Postoperative complications almost exclusively affect symptomatic patients. The most common surgical complications for complex aspergillomas include bleeding, prolonged air leaks, bronchopleural fistula, and Aspergillus infection of the residual cavity. Poor preoperative general condition is a risk factor for complications. Comprehensive preoperative management is recommended, including treatment of malnutrition, cessation of alcohol and tobacco use, and stabilization of underlying conditions, particularly diabetes. Preoperative antifungal treatment is also recommended.

When pulmonary resection is deemed too risky due to the patient's general condition or contraindicated by respiratory failure, a simple drainage of the abscessed cavity may be performed, followed, if necessary, by thoracoplasty, which aims to collapse the residual cavity.

== Other treatments ==
In cases of massive hemoptysis due to complex aspergilloma, bronchial artery embolization may be performed. However, outcomes are less favorable compared to other causes of hemoptysis due to the hypervascularization of complex aspergillomas. Embolization is considered a temporary measure pending surgery outside of life-threatening emergencies or antifungal treatment in cases of definitive surgical contraindication.

Direct administration of antifungals into the aspergilloma cavity (most commonly amphotericin B) yields variable results. In 2009, it was primarily used to treat massive hemoptysis in inoperable patients, and a 2013 study noted that its long-term benefits remain unknown.

== Considerations in Immunocompromised patients ==
In patients on immunosuppressive therapy, reducing the intensity of immunosuppression as much as possible is recommended upon suspicion of diagnosis to slow disease progression.

== Prognosis and follow-up ==
Historically identified prognostic factors include the severity of underlying lung disease, rapid radiological or biological worsening, immunodeficiency, and coexisting sarcoidosis or HIV infection.

A good treatment response is defined by the regression of radiologically observed lesions. The correlation between initial response quality and long-term prognosis has not been studied. Approximately 50% of patients show clinical and radiological improvement within the first year.

The goal of follow-up is to ensure the absence of progression of complex aspergilloma lesions. A control CT scan is recommended 3 to 6 months after treatment initiation. A low-dose CT scan, which is less irradiating, is recommended. Long-term surgical outcomes primarily depend on the patient's general condition.

Long-term mortality (over 10 years post-diagnosis) ranges from 37 to 67% across studies. Risk factors for mortality include advanced age, corticosteroid therapy, low body weight (BMI < 18.5)), and inflammatory syndrome at diagnosis. Lung tissue destruction and respiratory failure are also poor prognostic factors.

== See also ==
- Causes: Aspergillus, most commonly Aspergillus fumigatus.
- Symptoms: Often none, but may include hemoptysis (bloody sputum) and various symptoms (fever, cough).
- Treatment: Antifungal (Triazole: Itraconazole, Voriconazole, Posaconazole; see also Amphotericin B, Micafungin, Caspofungin)

== Bibliography ==
=== General articles ===
- Latgé, Jean-Paul (1999). "Aspergillus fumigatus and Aspergillosis". Clinical Microbiology Reviews. 12 (2). American Society for Microbiology: 310–350. doi:10.1128/CMR.12.2.310. ISSN 0893-8512. PMC 88920. PMID 10194462. Latgé.
- Passera, Eliseo; Rizzi, Adriano; Robustellini, Mario; Rossi, Gerolamo; Della Pona, Claudio; Massera, Fabio; Rocco, Gaetano (2012). "Pulmonary Aspergilloma". Thoracic Surgery Clinics. 22 (3). Elsevier BV: 345–361. doi:10.1016/j.thorsurg.2012.04.001. ISSN 1547-4127. Passera.
- Kosmidis, Chris; Denning, David W. (2014). "The clinical spectrum of pulmonary aspergillosis". Thorax. 70 (3). BMJ: 270–277. doi:10.1136/thoraxjnl-2014-206291. ISSN 0040-6376. PMID 25354514. Kosmidis.
- Godet, Cendrine; Philippe, Bruno; Laurent, François; Cadranel, Jacques (2014). "Chronic Pulmonary Aspergillosis: An Update on Diagnosis and Treatment". Respiration. 88 (2). S. Karger AG: 162–174. doi:10.1159/000362674. ISSN 1423-0356. PMID 24943102. Godet.

=== Professional Society guidelines ===
- Denning, David W.; Cadranel, Jacques; Beigelman-Aubry, Catherine; Ader, Florence; Chakrabarti, Arunaloke; Blot, Stijn; Ullmann, Andrew J.; Dimopoulos, George; Lange, Christoph (2015). "Chronic pulmonary aspergillosis: rationale and clinical guidelines for diagnosis and management". Eur Respir J. 47 (1). European Respiratory Society (ERS): 45–68. doi:10.1183/13993003.00583-2015. ISSN 0903-1936. PMID 26699723. Denning.
- Stevens, D. A.; Kan, V. L.; Judson, M. A.; Morrison, V. A.; Dummer, S.; Denning, D. W.; Bennett, J. E.; Walsh, T. J.; Patterson, T. F.; Pankey, G. A. (2000). "Practice Guidelines for Diseases Caused by Aspergillus". Clinical Infectious Diseases. 30 (4). Oxford University Press: 696–709. Bibcode:2000CliID..30..696S. doi:10.1086/313756. ISSN 1058-4838. PMID 10770732. Stevens.
- Walsh, Thomas J.; Anaissie, Elias J.; Denning, David W.; Herbrecht, Raoul; Kontoyiannis, Dimitrios P.; Marr, Kieren A.; Morrison, Vicki A.; Segal, Brahm H.; Steinbach, William J.; Stevens, David A.; van Burik, Jo Anne; Wingard, John R.; Patterson, Thomas F. (2008). "Treatment of Aspergillosis: Clinical Practice Guidelines of the Infectious Diseases Society of America". Clinical Infectious Diseases. 46 (3). Oxford University Press: 327–360. Bibcode:2008CliID..46..327W. doi:10.1086/525258. ISSN 1058-4838. PMID 18177225. Walsh.
