= Sputum culture =

Medical test to detect & identify bacteria or fungi in lung airways

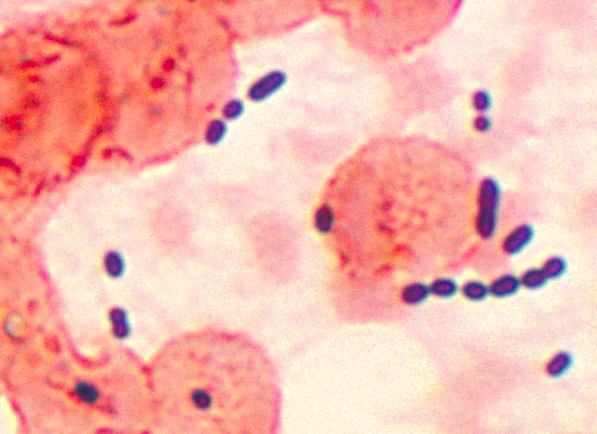
- Cocci-shaped Enterococcus sp. bacteria taken from a pneumonia patient
- ICD-9: 90.42

A sputum culture is a test to detect and identify bacteria or fungi that infect the lungs or breathing passages. Sputum is a thick fluid produced in the lungs and in the adjacent airways. Normally, fresh morning sample is preferred for the bacteriological examination of sputum. A sample of sputum is collected in a sterile, wide-mouthed, dry, leak-proof and break-resistant plastic-container and sent to the laboratory for testing. Sampling may be performed by sputum being expectorated (produced by coughing), induced (saline is sprayed in the lungs to induce sputum production), or taken via an endotracheal tube with a protected specimen brush (commonly used on patients on respirators) in an intensive care setting. For selected organisms such as Cytomegalovirus or "Pneumocystis jiroveci" in specific clinical settings (immunocompromised patients) a bronchoalveolar lavage might be taken by an experienced pneumologist. If no bacteria or fungi grow, the culture is negative. If organisms that can cause the infection (Pathogenicity organisms) grow, the culture is positive. The type of bacterium or fungus is identified by microscopy, colony morphology and biochemical tests of bacterial growth.

If bacteria or fungi that can cause infection grow in the culture, other tests can determine which antimicrobial agent will most effectively treat the infection. This is called susceptibility or sensitivity testing.

In a hospital setting, a sputum culture is most commonly ordered if a patient has a pneumonia. The Infectious Diseases Society of America recommends that sputum cultures be done in pneumonia requiring hospitalization, while the American College of Chest Physicians does not. One reason for such a discrepancy is that normal, healthy lungs have bacteria, and sputum cultures collect both normal and pathogenic bacteria. However, pure cultures of common respiratory pathogens in the absence of upper respiratory flora combined with symptoms of respiratory distress provides strong evidence of the infectious agent, and its significance. Such pathogens include Streptococcus pneumoniae, Haemophilus influenzae and the highly infectious M tuberculosis, which are transmitted by inhaling aerosols. For this reason, laboratory processing of sputum for respiratory pathogens are performed with the aid of a biological safety cabinet.
