= Biological functions of hydrogen sulfide =

Functions of hydrogen sulfide in organisms

Hydrogen sulfide is produced in small amounts by some cells of the mammalian body and has a number of biological signaling functions. Only two other such gases are currently known: nitric oxide (NO) and carbon monoxide (CO).

The gas is produced from cysteine by the enzymes cystathionine beta-synthase and cystathionine gamma-lyase. It acts as a relaxant of smooth muscle and as a vasodilator and is also active in the brain, where it increases the response of the NMDA receptor and facilitates long term potentiation, which is involved in the formation of memory.

Eventually the gas is converted to sulfite in the mitochondria by thiosulfate reductase, and the sulfite is further oxidized to thiosulfate and sulfate by sulfite oxidase. The sulfates are excreted in the urine.

Due to its effects similar to nitric oxide (without its potential to form peroxides by interacting with superoxide), hydrogen sulfide is now recognized as potentially protecting against cardiovascular disease. The cardioprotective role effect of garlic is caused by catabolism of the polysulfide group in allicin to H_{2}S, a reaction that could depend on reduction mediated by glutathione.

Though both nitric oxide (NO) and hydrogen sulfide have been shown to relax blood vessels, their mechanisms of action are different: while NO activates the enzyme guanylyl cyclase, H_{2}S activates ATP-sensitive potassium channels in smooth muscle cells. Researchers are not clear how the vessel-relaxing responsibilities are shared between nitric oxide and hydrogen sulfide. However, there exists some evidence to suggest that nitric oxide does most of the vessel-relaxing work in large vessels and hydrogen sulfide is responsible for similar action in smaller blood vessels.

Recent findings suggest strong cellular crosstalk of NO and H_{2}S, demonstrating that the vasodilatatory effects of these two gases are mutually dependent. Additionally, H_{2}S reacts with intracellular S-nitrosothiols to form the smallest S-nitrosothiol (HSNO), and a role of hydrogen sulfide in controlling the intracellular S-nitrosothiol pool has been suggested.

Like nitric oxide, hydrogen sulfide is involved in the relaxation of smooth muscle that causes erection of the penis, presenting possible new therapy opportunities for erectile dysfunction.

Hydrogen sulfide (H_{2}S) deficiency can be detrimental to the vascular function after an acute myocardial infarction (AMI). AMIs can lead to cardiac dysfunction through two distinct changes; increased oxidative stress via free radical accumulation and decreased NO bioavailability. Free radical accumulation occurs due to increased electron transport uncoupling at the active site of endothelial nitric oxide synthase (eNOS), an enzyme involved in converting L-arginine to NO. During an AMI, oxidative degradation of tetrahydrobiopterin (BH4), a cofactor in NO production, limits BH4 availability and limits NO production by eNOS. Instead, eNOS reacts with oxygen, another cosubstrates involved in NO production. The products of eNOS are reduced to superoxides, increasing free radical production and oxidative stress within the cells. A H_{2}S deficiency impairs eNOS activity by limiting Akt activation and inhibiting Akt phosphorylation of the eNOSS1177 activation site. Instead, Akt activity is increased to phosphorylate the eNOST495 inhibition site, downregulating eNOS production of NO.

H_{2}S therapy uses a H_{2}S donor, such as diallyl trisulfide (DATS), to increase the supply of H_{2}S to an AMI patient. H_{2}S donors reduce myocardial injury and reperfusion complications. Increased H_{2}S levels within the body will react with oxygen to produce sulfane sulfur, a storage intermediate for H_{2}S. H_{2}S pools in the body attracts oxygen to react with excess H_{2}S and eNOS to increase NO production. With increased use of oxygen to produce more NO, less oxygen is available to react with eNOS to produce superoxides during an AMI, ultimately lowering the accumulation of reactive oxygen species (ROS). Furthermore, decreased accumulation of ROS lowers oxidative stress in vascular smooth muscle cells, decreasing oxidative degeneration of BH4. Increased BH4 cofactor contributes to increased production of NO within the body. Higher concentrations of H_{2}S directly increase eNOS activity through Akt activation to increase phosphorylation of the eNOSS1177 activation site, and decrease phosphorylation of the eNOST495 inhibition site. This phosphorylation process upregulates eNOS activity, catalyzing more conversion of L-arginine to NO. Increased NO production enables soluble guanylyl cyclase (sGC) activity, leading to an increased conversion of guanosine triphosphate (GTP) to 3’,5’-cyclic guanosine monophosphate (cGMP). In H_{2}S therapy immediately following an AMI, increased cGMP triggers an increase in protein kinase G (PKG) activity. PKG reduces intracellular Ca2+ in vascular smooth muscle to increase smooth muscle relaxation and promote blood flow. PKG also limits smooth muscle cell proliferation, reducing intima thickening following AMI injury, ultimately decreasing myocardial infarct size.

In a certain rat model of Parkinson's disease, the brain's hydrogen sulfide concentration was found to be reduced, and administering hydrogen sulfide alleviated the condition. In trisomy 21 (Down syndrome) the body produces an excess of hydrogen sulfide. Hydrogen sulfide is also involved in the disease process of type 1 diabetes. The beta cells of the pancreas in type 1 diabetes produce an excess of the gas, leading to the death of these cells and to a reduced production of insulin by those that remain.

In 2005, it was shown that mice can be put into a state of suspended animation-like hypothermia by applying a low dosage of hydrogen sulfide (81 ppm H_{2}S) in the air. The breathing rate of the animals sank from 120 to 10 breaths per minute and their temperature fell from 37 °C to just 2 °C above ambient temperature (in effect, they had become cold-blooded). The mice survived this procedure for 6 hours and afterwards showed no negative health consequences. In 2006 it was shown that the blood pressure of mice treated in this fashion with hydrogen sulfide did not significantly decrease.

A similar process known as hibernation occurs naturally in many mammals and also in toads, but not in mice. (Mice can fall into a state called clinical torpor when food shortage occurs). If the H_{2}S-induced hibernation can be made to work in humans, it could be useful in the emergency management of severely injured patients, and in the conservation of donated organs. In 2008, hypothermia induced by hydrogen sulfide for 48 hours was shown to reduce the extent of brain damage caused by experimental stroke in rats.

As mentioned above, hydrogen sulfide binds to cytochrome oxidase and thereby prevents oxygen from binding, which leads to the dramatic slowdown of metabolism. Animals and humans naturally produce some hydrogen sulfide in their body; researchers have proposed that the gas is used to regulate metabolic activity and body temperature, which would explain the above findings.

Two recent studies cast doubt that the effect can be achieved in larger mammals. A 2008 study failed to reproduce the effect in pigs, concluding that the effects seen in mice were not present in larger mammals. Likewise a paper by Haouzi et al. noted that there is no induction of hypometabolism in sheep, either.

At the February 2010 TED conference, Mark Roth announced that hydrogen sulfide induced hypothermia in humans had completed Phase I clinical trials. The clinical trials commissioned by the company he helped found, Ikaria, were however withdrawn or terminated by August 2011.
