= Balloon pulmonary angioplasty =

Medical procedure

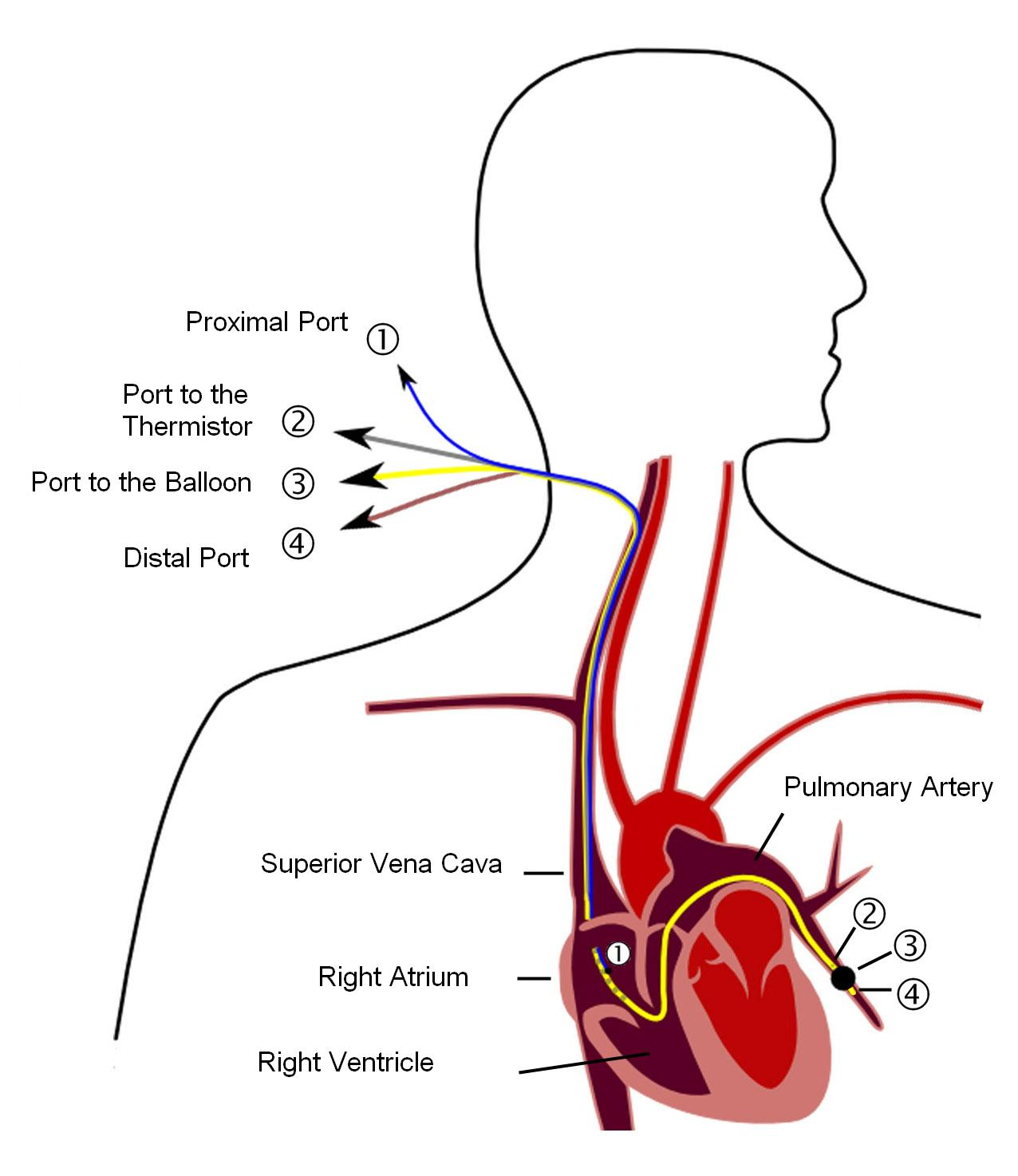
- Other names: BPA
- Specialty: Cardiovascular medicine

Balloon pulmonary angioplasty (BPA) is an emerging minimally invasive procedure to treat chronic thromboembolic pulmonary hypertension (CTEPH) in people who are not suitable for pulmonary thromboendarterectomy (PTE) or still have residual pulmonary hypertension and areas of narrowing in the pulmonary arterial tree following previous PTE.

The procedure uses balloons to open pulmonary arteries that have been narrowed or blocked by webs, bands and fibrous tissue and therefore restores blood flow to the lungs, reduces shortness of breath, and improves exercise tolerance. More data on its safety and effectiveness are still required.

== Medical uses ==
BPA may be considered in people with symptomatic CTEPH who are not suitable for surgery. PTE is an established treatment for CTEPH but is only performed at a few specialist centres, requires surgical competence and intermittent total circulatory arrest under deep hypothermia. However, co-existing illnesses and inaccessible clots may contraindicate performing the operation. Up to 40% of those diagnosed with CTEPH are considered ineligible for surgery. Selection criteria may vary between centres.

== Technique ==
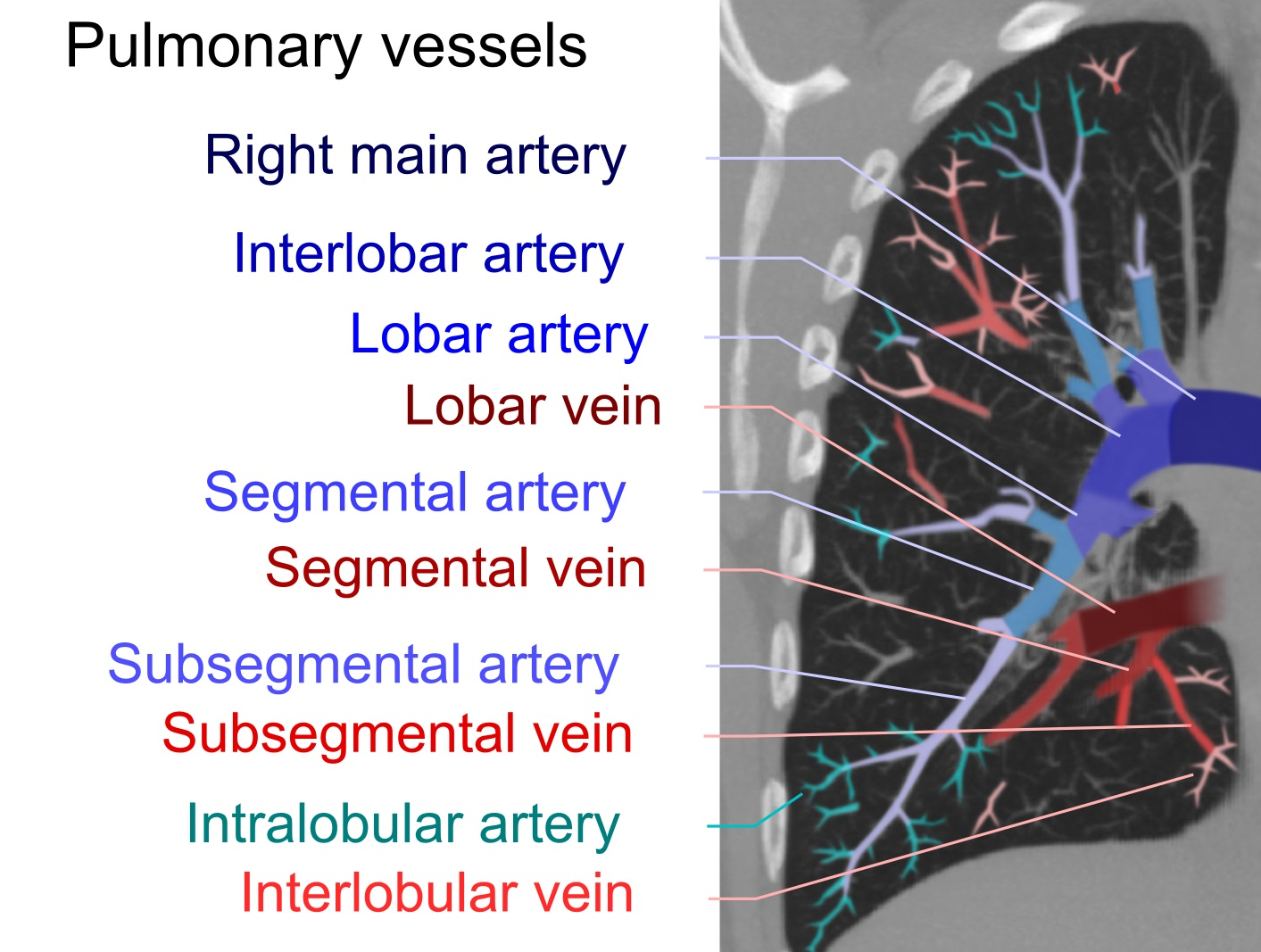
Computed tomograph of pulmonary vessels. Pulmonary emboli can be classified according to level along the arterial tree.

BPA is performed by specialists in a catheterization laboratory. Each procedure takes between two and four hours and most people undergo up to six treatments with the first two sessions being performed a fortnight apart and subsequent treatments being individually tailored upon follow-up assessment.

A local anesthetic and moderate sedation are used but a general anaesthetic is not required, hence the person remains awake throughout the procedure. After inserting the catheter into the vein of the neck (right internal jugular vein) or groin (right femoral vein), a hollow tube is introduced through the catheter and passed to the affected blocked lung arteries.

X-rays and pressures in the narrowed arteries are assessed by the specialist team before a thin wire with a deflated balloon is guided through the blood vessels to the site of blockage, where the balloon is then inflated. This mainly disrupts the organised thrombus and to a lesser degree presses it against the walls of the arteries. This increases the size of the lumen of the arteries, thus opening them and allowing the blood flow to be restored. The balloon is then deflated and removed. A number of arteries can be treated during each BPA procedure.

== Recovery and follow-up ==
One overnight stay in hospital is usually required. This is followed by a check up appointment within three months. The overall survival has been shown to be comparable with PTE and better than with medication only.

== Complications ==
The pulmonary arteries have thinner walls than the blood vessels of the heart and therefore injury by rupture or dissection caused by over-dilatation of the balloon or piercing pulmonary arteries by the tip of the guide wire, resulting in haemorrhage, are risks. Injury to the lung including reperfusion oedema is also a possibility and these injuries are less likely with more experienced specialists.

== History ==
BPA was originally developed and established for treating children with congenital pulmonary stenosis. Subsequently, it was first tried for the treatment of CTEPH in 1988. Initial results of performing BPA in inoperable CTEPH were reported in 2001, but had a high mortality. Since 2012, reports of the effect of BPA has mainly come from the National Hospital Organization Okayama Medical Center in Japan where the procedure was refined and where smaller balloons were used. In addition, the number of balloon inflations per session were carefully limited to one or two lung vessel segments with targeting only one lung lobe during each session. Intravascular imaging was also introduced.

== Research ==
More data on its safety and effectiveness are still required. Long-term results on disease recurrence, the requirement for stenting and long-term survival also need to be evaluated. In addition, studies to clarify BPA's comparability with the drug riociguat are needed.

== See also ==
- Angioplasty
