= Suspended animation (disambiguation) =

Suspended animation is the slowing or stopping of life processes without termination.

Suspended animation may also refer to:

- Suspended animation in fiction, a trope in fictional works
- Suspended Animation (The Monks album), 1981
- Suspended Animation (John Petrucci album), 2005
- Suspended Animation (Fantômas album), 2005
- Suspended Animation (Esham album), 2010
- Suspended Animation (film), 2001
- Suspended Animation, Inc, an American company that coordinates cryopreservation

== See also ==
- Dormancy, a period in an organism's life when growth, development, or physical activity are temporarily stopped
