= Chronic thromboembolic pulmonary hypertension =

- Other names: CTEPH
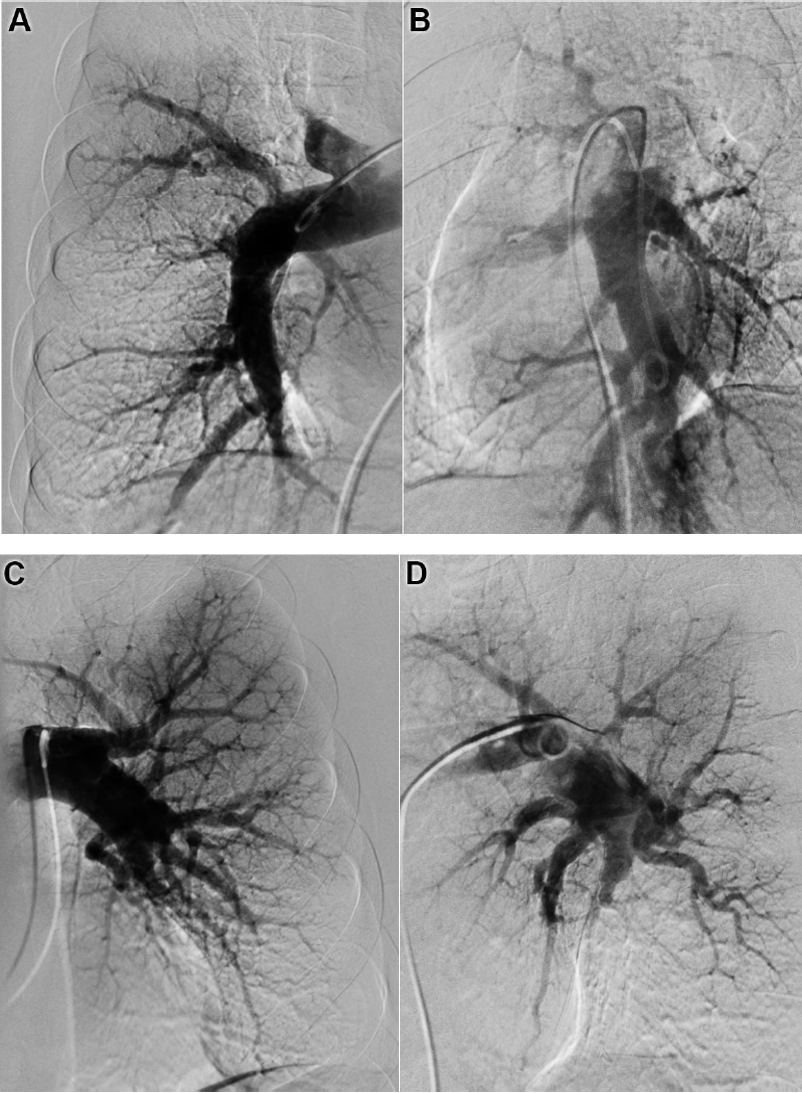
- Example of a side-selective pulmonary artery angiogram (A and B right pulmonary artery, C and D left pulmonary artery) in digital subtraction technique of a patient with CTEPH. Panels A and C represent anterior-posterior projections, and panels B and D represent lateral projections.
- Specialty: Pulmonology, cardiology
- Usual onset: 63 years (median)
- Duration: Long term
- Risk factors: Splenectomy, inflammatory bowel disease, chronic thyroid hormone replacement, blood types other than O, malignancy, infected ventriculo-atrial shunt, permanent intravenous leads
- Diagnostic method: Invasively measured mean pulmonary arterial pressure combined with specialist imaging
- Treatment: Pulmonary endarterectomy, Balloon pulmonary angioplasty, medical treatment
- Frequency: 5 cases per million

Chronic thromboembolic pulmonary hypertension (CTEPH) is a long-term disease caused by a blockage in the blood vessels that deliver blood from the heart to the lungs (the pulmonary arterial tree). These blockages cause increased resistance to flow in the pulmonary arterial tree, which in turn leads to a rise in pressure in these arteries (pulmonary hypertension). The blockages either result from organised (or hardened) blood clots that usually originate from the deep veins of the lower limbs of the body (thromboembolism) and lodge in the pulmonary arterial tree after passing through the right side of the heart. The blockages may also result from scar tissue that forms at the site where the clot has damaged the endothelial lining of the pulmonary arteries, causing permanent fibrous obstruction (blood flow blockage). Most patients have a combination of microvascular (small vessel) and macrovascular (large vessel) obstruction. Some patients may present with normal or near-normal pulmonary pressures at rest despite symptomatic disease. These patients are labelled as having chronic thromboembolic disease (CTED).

Diagnosis is made after at least three months of effective blood thinning to discern this condition from subacute pulmonary embolism. Diagnostic findings for CTEPH are:

1. Invasively (i.e., in the blood) measured mean pulmonary arterial pressure (mPAP) ≥25 mmHg;
2. Mismatched perfusion defects on lung ventilation/perfusion (V/Q) scan and specific diagnostic signs for CTEPH seen by multidetector computed tomography angiography (MDCT), magnetic resonance imaging (MRI) or conventional pulmonary cineangiography (PAG), such as ring-like stenoses, webs/slits, chronic total occlusions (pouch lesions, or tapered lesions) and tortuous lesions.

== Signs and symptoms ==
Clinical symptoms and signs are often non-specific or absent in early CTEPH, with signs of right heart failure only in advanced disease. The main symptom of CTEPH is exertional breathlessness (shortness of breath during exertion, such as exercise), which is nonspecific and may often be attributed to other, more common diseases by physicians. When present, the clinical symptoms of CTEPH may resemble those of acute PE, or of idiopathic pulmonary arterial hypertension (iPAH). Leg oedema (swelling) and haemoptysis (blood in mucus) occur more often in CTEPH, while syncope (fainting) is more common in iPAH.

== Pathogenesis ==
People with CTEPH lack traditional thrombosis risk factors. Current understanding is that CTEPH is a result of “inflammatory thrombosis”: When pro-thrombotic (blood-clot forming) conditions combine with chronic inflammation and infection, non-resolution of thrombus may ensue. Risk factors for CTEPH include splenectomy, inflammatory bowel disease, chronic thyroid hormone replacement, blood types other than 0, malignancy, infected ventriculo-atrial shunt, and permanent intravenous leads.

== Diagnosis ==
Early diagnosis remains a challenge in CTEPH, with a median time of 14 months between symptom onset and diagnosis in expert centres. A suspicion of PH is often raised by echocardiography, but an invasive right heart catheterisation is required to confirm it. Once PH is diagnosed, the presence of thromboembolic disease requires imaging. The recommended diagnostic algorithm stresses the importance of initial investigation using an echocardiogram and V/Q scan and confirmation with right heart catheter and pulmonary angiography (PA).

Both V/Q scanning and modern multidetector CT angiography (CTPA) may be accurate methods for the detection of CTEPH, with excellent diagnostic efficacy in expert hands (sensitivity, specificity, and accuracy of 100%, 93.7%, and 96.5% for V/Q and 96.1%, 95.2%, and 95.6% for CTPA). CTPA alone cannot exclude the disease, but may help identify pulmonary artery distension resulting in left main coronary artery compression, pulmonary parenchymal lesions (e.g. as complications from previous pulmonary infarctions), and bleeding from bronchial collateral arteries.

== Treatment ==
Decision-making for patients with CTEPH can be complex and needs to be managed by CTEPH teams in expert centres. CTEPH teams comprise cardiologists and pulmonologists with specialist PH training, radiologists, experienced PEA surgeons with a significant caseload of CTEPH patients per year, and physicians with percutaneous interventional expertise. Currently, three recognised targeted treatment options are available, including the standard treatment of pulmonary endarterectomy (PEA). Balloon pulmonary angioplasty (BPA) and pulmonary vasodilator drug treatment may be considered for those who are not suitable for surgery.

Specialist imaging using either magnetic resonance or invasive PA is necessary to determine risks and benefits of interventional treatment with PEA or BPA.

=== Medical therapy ===
Standard medical treatment consists of anticoagulants (blood thinners), diuretics, and oxygen. Lifelong anticoagulation is recommended, even after PEA. Routine inferior vena cava filter placement is not recommended.

In patients with non-operable CTEPH or persistent/recurrent PH after PEA, there is evidence for benefit from pulmonary vasodilator drug treatment. The microvascular disease component in CTEPH has provided the rationale for off-label use of drugs approved for PAH. Currently, only riociguat (a stimulator of soluble guanylate cyclase) is approved for treatment of adults with inoperable CTEPH or persistent or recurrent CTEPH after surgical treatment. Other drug trials are ongoing in patients with inoperable CTEPH, with macitentan recently proving efficacy and safety in MERIT

=== Pulmonary endarterectomy ===
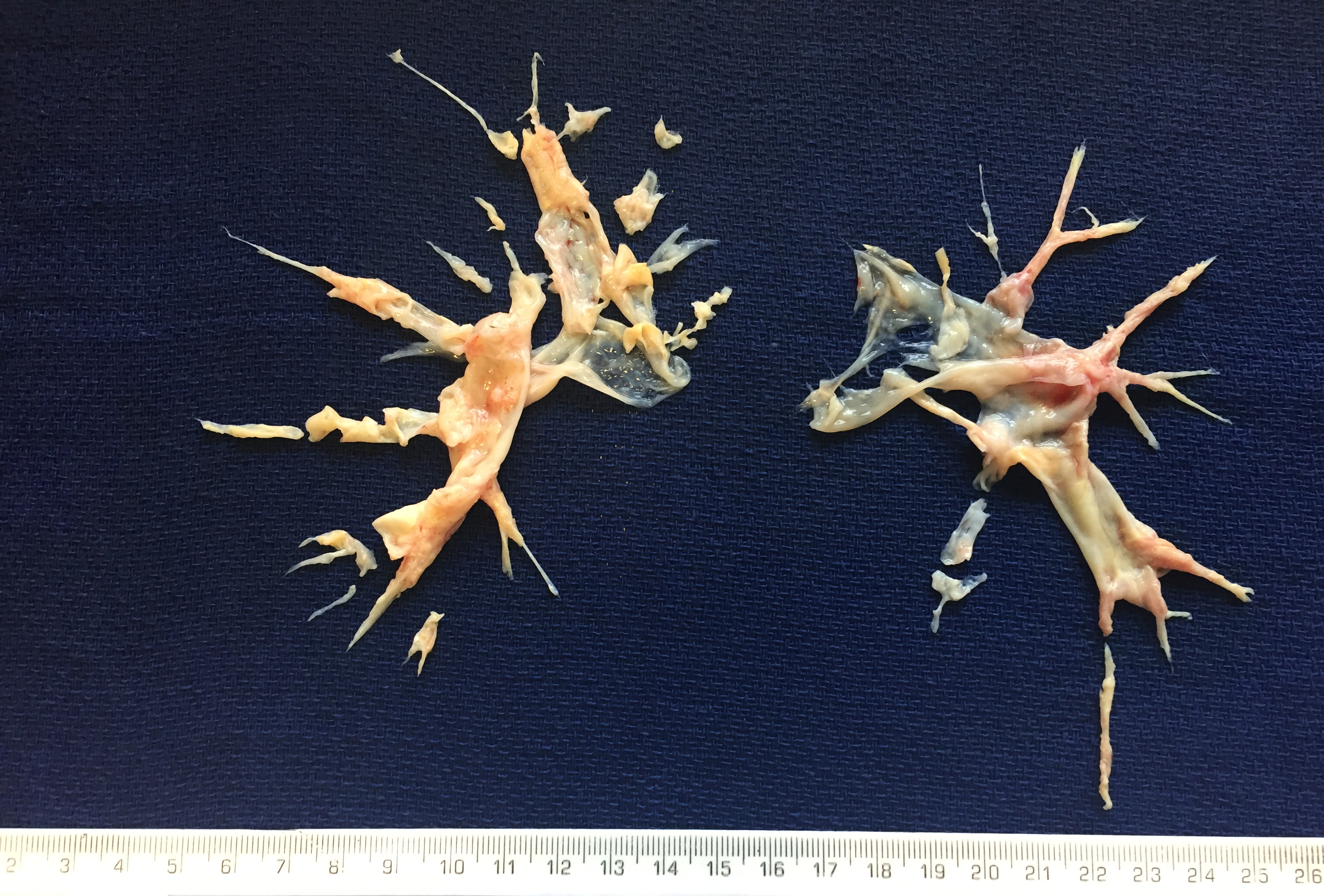
Typical specimen harvested during the surgical procedure of pulmonary endarterectomy in a patient with chronic thromboembolic pulmonary hypertension.

Pulmonary endarterectomy (PEA) is the gold standard treatment for suitable CTEPH patients. Operability of patients with CTEPH is determined by multiple factors, among which the surgical accessibility of thrombi and the patient-determined risk-benefit ratio are most important. There is no haemodynamic (e.g., considering pulmonary pressure) or age threshold that should exclude patients from surgery, and concomitant cardiac procedures can be included if necessary. About 60% of patients are classified as operable across Europe and Canada.

In contrast to surgical embolectomy for acute PE, treatment of CTEPH necessitates a true bilateral endarterectomy (removal of blockage from the blood vessels) through the medial layer of the pulmonary arteries, which is performed under deep hypothermia (lowering of body temperature) and circulatory arrest (temporary stoppage of blood flow), which is not complicated by cognitive dysfunction. The majority of patients experience substantial relief from symptoms and improvement in haemodynamics after PEA. In Europe, in-hospital mortality during PEA is currently 4.7% or lower in high volume single centres.

Up to 35% of patients may have persistent/recurrent CTEPH following surgery. The definition of post-PEA PH is still not clear, but some data suggest that 500–590 dynes·s·cm^{−5} may represent a pulmonary vascular resistance (PVR) threshold for poor long-term outcome. Recent data from National UK PEA cohort suggests residual PH post PEA only impacts on longer term survival when mPAP is >38 mmHg or PVR >425 dynes·s·cm^{−5}.

Bridging therapy with PAH-targeted drugs, complications, and additional procedures during PEA, and residual PH after PEA are associated with worse outcomes. Immediate postoperative PVR is a long-term predictor of prognosis.

=== Balloon pulmonary angioplasty ===
Although BPA technique is still evolving, it may currently be considered for CTEPH patients who are technically non-operable or carry an unfavourable risk-benefit ratio for PEA. The technique has been refined in Japan and initial reports have confirmed the safety and efficacy of the technique, based on data showing haemodynamic improvement and recovery of right ventricular function. Research is ongoing.

== Prognosis ==
Historically, the prognosis for patients with untreated CTEPH was poor, with a 5-year survival of <40% if the mPAP was >40 mmHg at presentation. More contemporary data from the European CTEPH registry have demonstrated a 70% 3-year survival in patients with CTEPH who do not undergo the surgical procedure of pulmonary endarterectomy (PEA). Recent data from an international CTEPH registry demonstrate that mortality in CTEPH is associated with New York Heart Association (NYHA) functional class IV, increased right atrial pressure, and a history of cancer. Furthermore, comorbidities such as coronary disease, left heart failure, and chronic obstructive pulmonary disease (COPD) are risk factors for mortality.

== Epidemiology ==
CTEPH is an orphan disease with an estimated incidence of 5 cases per million, but CTEPH is likely under-diagnosed as symptoms are non-specific. Although a cumulative incidence of CTEPH between 0.1% and 9.1% within the first 2 years after a symptomatic PE has been reported, it is currently unclear whether acute symptomatic PE begets CTEPH. Routine screening for CTEPH after PE is not recommended because a significant number of CTEPH cases develops in the absence of previous acute symptomatic PE. In addition, approximately 25% of patients with CTEPH do not present with a clinical history of acute PE. The median age of patients at diagnosis is 63 years (there is a wide age range, but paediatric cases are rare), and both genders are equally affected.
