= Pulmonary angiography =

Minimally invasive medical procedure

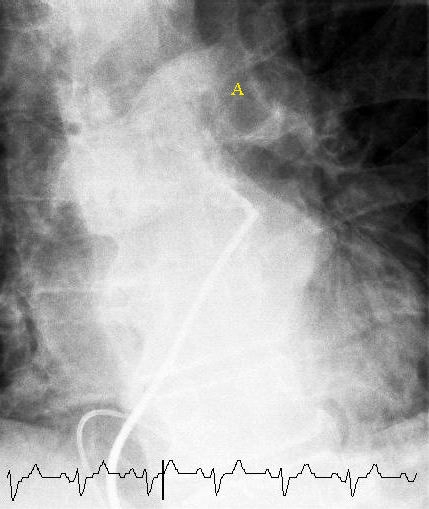
Selective pulmonary angiogram revealing significant thrombus (labelled A) causing a central obstruction in the left main pulmonary artery

Pulmonary angiography (or pulmonary arteriography,conventional pulmonary angiography, selective pulmonary angiography) is a medical fluoroscopic procedure used to visualize the pulmonary arteries and much less frequently, the pulmonary veins. It is a minimally invasive procedure performed most frequently by an interventional radiologist or interventional cardiologist to visualise the arteries of the lungs.

== Uses ==
Pulmonary angiography is useful as the confirmation test where the non-invasive imaging such as CT pulmonary angiography is inconclusive on determining the presence of pulmonary embolism. The accuracy of pulmonary angiography may be higher than clinical examination, arterial blood gas results, and ventilation/perfusion scan. Pulmonary angiography is also used to confirm chronic thromboembolic pulmonary hypertension (CTEPH) and provides a platform for balloon pulmonary angioplasty to treat the disease.

CT pulmonary angiography has nearly entirely replaced conventional pulmonary angiography in common practice as it is less invasive, faster, safer, and provides most of the same diagnostic information with the added benefit of visualizing the lung tissue as well as other structures. Nevertheless, it is still used in cases where CT angiography is nondiagnostic.

== Procedure ==
Types of catheters that can be used are pigtail catheters and balloon occlusion catheters. Tip of the catheter is advanced through the inferior vena cava, right atrium, right ventricle, right ventricular outflow tract, pulmonary trunk, and the tip is parked in the left pulmonary artery.

== History ==
Conventional pulmonary angiography was first performed in 1931 by Portuguese angiography pioneers Lopo de Carvalho, Egas Moniz and colleagues. Robb and Steinberg described pulmonary angiography by infusion of peripheral radiocontrast.
