= Clinical death =

Medical term defining death

Clinical death is the medical term for cessation of blood circulation and breathing, the two criteria necessary to sustain the lives of human beings and of many other organisms. It occurs when the heart stops beating in a regular rhythm, a condition called cardiac arrest. The term is also sometimes used in resuscitation research.

Stopped blood circulation has historically proven irreversible in most cases. Prior to the invention of cardiopulmonary resuscitation (CPR), defibrillation, epinephrine injection, and other treatments in the 20th century, the absence of blood circulation (and vital functions related to blood circulation) was historically considered the official definition of death. With the advent of these strategies, cardiac arrest came to be called clinical death rather than simply death, to reflect the possibility of post-arrest resuscitation.

At the onset of clinical death, consciousness is lost within several seconds, and in dogs, measurable brain activity has been measured to stop within 20 to 40 seconds. Irregular gasping may occur during this early time period, and is sometimes mistaken by rescuers as a sign that CPR is not necessary. During clinical death, all tissues and organs in the body steadily accumulate a type of injury called ischemic injury.

== Limits of reversal ==
Most tissues and organs of the body can survive clinical death for considerable periods. Blood circulation can be stopped in the entire body below the heart for at least 30 minutes, with injury to the spinal cord being a limiting factor. Detached limbs may be successfully reattached after 6 hours of no blood circulation at warm temperatures. Bone, tendon, and skin can survive as long as 8 to 12 hours.

The brain, however, appears to accumulate ischemic injury faster than any other organ. Without special treatment after circulation is restarted, full recovery of the brain after more than 3 minutes of clinical death at normal body temperature is rare. Usually brain damage or later brain death results after longer intervals of clinical death even if the heart is restarted and blood circulation is successfully restored. Brain injury is therefore the chief limiting factor for recovery from clinical death.

Although loss of function is almost immediate, there is no specific duration of clinical death at which the non-functioning brain clearly dies. The most vulnerable cells in the brain, CA1 neurons of the hippocampus, are fatally injured by as little as 10 minutes without oxygen. However, the injured cells do not actually die until hours after resuscitation. This delayed death can be prevented in vitro by a simple drug treatment even after 20 minutes without oxygen. In other areas of the brain, viable human neurons have been recovered and grown in culture hours after clinical death. Brain failure after clinical death is now known to be due to a complex series of processes called reperfusion injury that occur after blood circulation has been restored, especially processes that interfere with blood circulation during the recovery period. Control of these processes is the subject of ongoing research.

In 1990, the laboratory of resuscitation pioneer Peter Safar discovered that reducing body temperature by three degrees Celsius after restarting blood circulation could double the time window of recovery from clinical death without brain damage from 5 minutes to 10 minutes. This induced hypothermia technique is beginning to be used in emergency medicine. The combination of mildly reducing body temperature, reducing blood cell concentration, and increasing blood pressure after resuscitation was found especially effective – allowing for recovery of dogs after 12 minutes of clinical death at normal body temperature with practically no brain injury. The addition of a drug treatment protocol has been reported to allow recovery of dogs after 16 minutes of clinical death at normal body temperature with no lasting brain injury. Cooling treatment alone has permitted recovery after 17 minutes of clinical death at normal temperature, but with brain injury.

Under laboratory conditions at normal body temperature, the longest period of clinical death of a cat (after complete circulatory arrest) survived with eventual return of brain function is one hour.

== Hypothermia ==
Reduced body temperature, or therapeutic hypothermia, during clinical death slows the rate of injury accumulation, and extends the time period during which clinical death can be survived. The decrease in the rate of injury can be approximated by the Q_{10} rule, which states that the rate of biochemical reactions decreases by a factor of two for every 10 °C reduction in temperature. As a result, humans can sometimes survive periods of clinical death exceeding one hour at temperatures below 20 °C. The prognosis is improved if clinical death is caused by hypothermia rather than occurring prior to it; in 1999, 29-year-old Swedish woman Anna Bågenholm spent 80 minutes trapped in ice and survived with a near full recovery from a 13.7 °C core body temperature. It is said in emergency medicine that "nobody is dead until they are warm and dead." In animal studies, up to three hours of clinical death can be survived at temperatures near 0 °C.

== Life support ==
The purpose of cardiopulmonary resuscitation (CPR) during cardiac arrest is ideally reversal of the clinically dead state by restoration of blood circulation and breathing. However, there is great variation in the effectiveness of CPR for this purpose. Blood pressure is very low during manual CPR, resulting in only a ten-minute average extension of survival. Yet there are cases of patients regaining consciousness during CPR while still in full cardiac arrest. In absence of cerebral function monitoring or frank return to consciousness, the neurological status of patients undergoing CPR is intrinsically uncertain. It is somewhere between the state of clinical death and a normal functioning state.

Patients supported by methods that certainly maintain enough blood circulation and oxygenation for sustaining life during stopped heartbeat and breathing, such as cardiopulmonary bypass, are not customarily considered clinically dead. All parts of the body except the heart and lungs continue to function normally. Clinical death occurs only if machines providing sole circulatory support are turned off, leaving the patient in a state of stopped blood circulation.

== Controlled ==
Certain surgeries for cerebral aneurysms or aortic arch defects require that blood circulation be stopped while repairs are performed. This deliberate temporary induction of clinical death is called circulatory arrest. It is typically performed by lowering body temperature to between 18 °C and 20 °C (64 and 68 °F) and stopping the heart and lungs. This state is called deep hypothermic circulatory arrest. At such low temperatures most patients can tolerate the clinically dead state for up to 30 minutes without incurring significant brain injury. Longer durations are possible at lower temperatures, but the usefulness of longer procedures has not been established yet.

Controlled clinical death has also been proposed as a treatment for exsanguinating trauma to create time for surgical repair.

== Determination ==
Death was historically believed to be an event that coincided with the onset of clinical death. It is now understood that death is a series of physical events, not a single one, and determination of permanent death is dependent on other factors beyond simple cessation of breathing and heartbeat.

Clinical death that occurs unexpectedly is treated as a medical emergency. CPR is initiated. In a United States hospital, a Code Blue is declared and Advanced Cardiac Life Support procedures used to attempt to restart a normal heartbeat. This effort continues until either the heart is restarted, or a physician determines that continued efforts are useless and recovery is impossible. If this determination is made, the physician pronounces legal death and resuscitation efforts stop.

If clinical death is expected due to terminal illness or withdrawal of supportive care, often a Do Not Resuscitate (DNR) or "no code" order is in place. This means that no resuscitation efforts are made, and a physician or nurse may pronounce legal death at the onset of clinical death.

A patient with working heart and lungs who is determined to be brain dead can be pronounced legally dead without clinical death occurring. However, some courts have been reluctant to impose such a determination over the religious objections of family members, such as in the Jesse Koochin case. Similar issues were also raised by the case of Mordechai Dov Brody, but the child died before a court could resolve the matter. Conversely, in the case of Marlise Muñoz, a hospital refused to remove a brain dead woman from life support machines for nearly two months, despite her husband's requests, because she was pregnant.

== See also ==
- Death
- Brain death
- Legal death
- Cardiac arrest
- Deep hypothermic circulatory arrest
- Therapeutic hypothermia
- Information-theoretic death
- Lazarus phenomenon
- Near-death experience
