= Pulmonary thrombectomy =

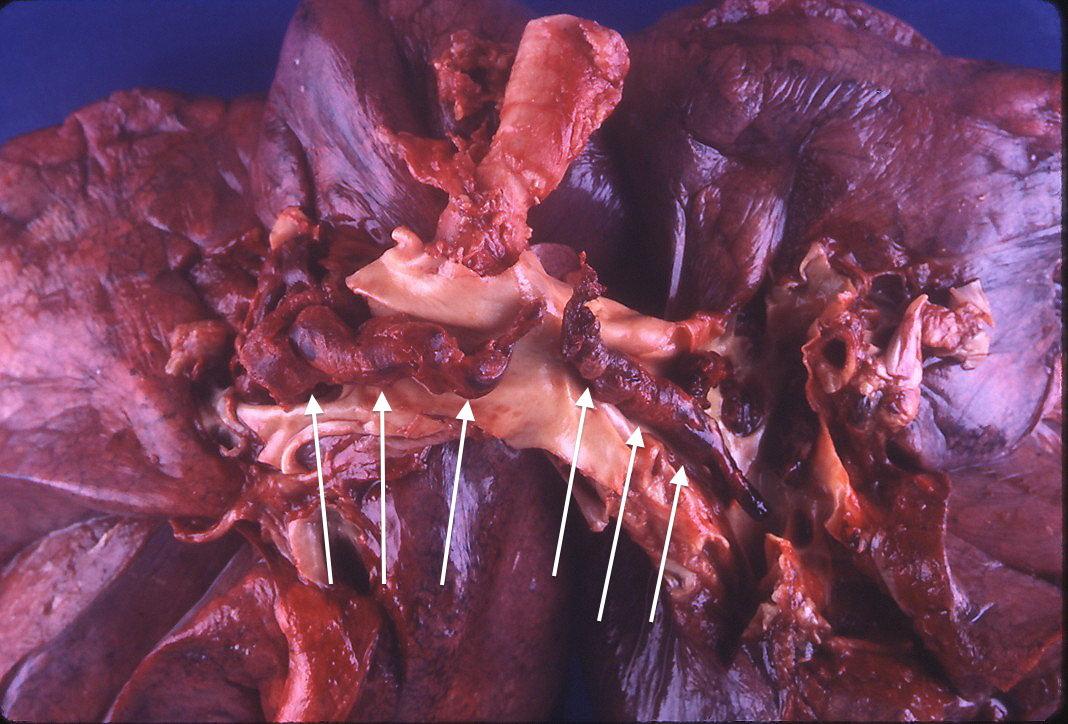
Large saddle thromboembolus in the pulmonary arteries (white arrows)

A pulmonary thrombectomy is an emergency surgical procedure used to remove blood clots from the pulmonary arteries.

Mechanical thrombectomies can be surgical (surgical thrombectomy) or percutaneous (percutaneous thrombectomy).

Surgical thrombectomies were once popular but were abandoned because of poor long-term outcomes. Recently, in selected patients, they have gone through a resurgence with the revision of the surgical technique.

== Relation to PTE ==
Pulmonary thrombectomies and pulmonary thromboendarterectomies (PTEs) are both operations that remove thrombus. Aside from this similarity they differ in many ways.

- PTEs are done on a nonemergency basis while pulmonary thrombectomies are typically done as an emergency procedure.
- PTEs typically are done using hypothermia and full cardiac arrest.
- PTEs are done for chronic pulmonary embolism, thrombectomies for severe acute pulmonary embolism.
- PTEs are generally considered a very effective treatment, surgical thrombectomies are an area of some controversy and their effectiveness a matter of some debate in the medical community.

== See also ==
- Pulmonary embolism
- Heart-lung machine
