= Emergency Preservation and Resuscitation =

Experimental emergency medicine procedure

Emergency Preservation and Resuscitation (EPR) is an experimental medical procedure where an emergency department patient is cooled into suspended animation for an hour to prevent incipient death from ischemia, such as the blood loss following a shooting or stabbing. EPR uses hypothermia, drugs, and fluids to "buy time" for resuscitative surgery. If successful, EPR may someday be deployed in the field so that paramedics can suspend and preserve patients for transport.

EPR is similar to deep hypothermic circulatory arrest (DHCA) in that hypothermia is induced. However, the purposes and procedures of EPR differ from DHCA. DHCA induces hypothermia to aid preplanned surgery, whereas EPR is an emergency procedure in cases where an emergency department patient is rapidly dying from blood loss and will not otherwise survive long enough for the patient's wounds to be stitched up. In EPR, blood is replaced by a saline solution, and the patient is cooled into a suspended state where metabolism is slowed and brain activity ceases. This gives the surgeon perhaps an hour to close the wounds before a warming and recirculation procedure is applied.

Human trials began in the 2010s. The trial procedure involves rapidly inducing profound hypothermia (10 °C) with an aortic flush in trauma victims that have suffered cardiac arrest and failed standard resuscitative efforts.

== History ==
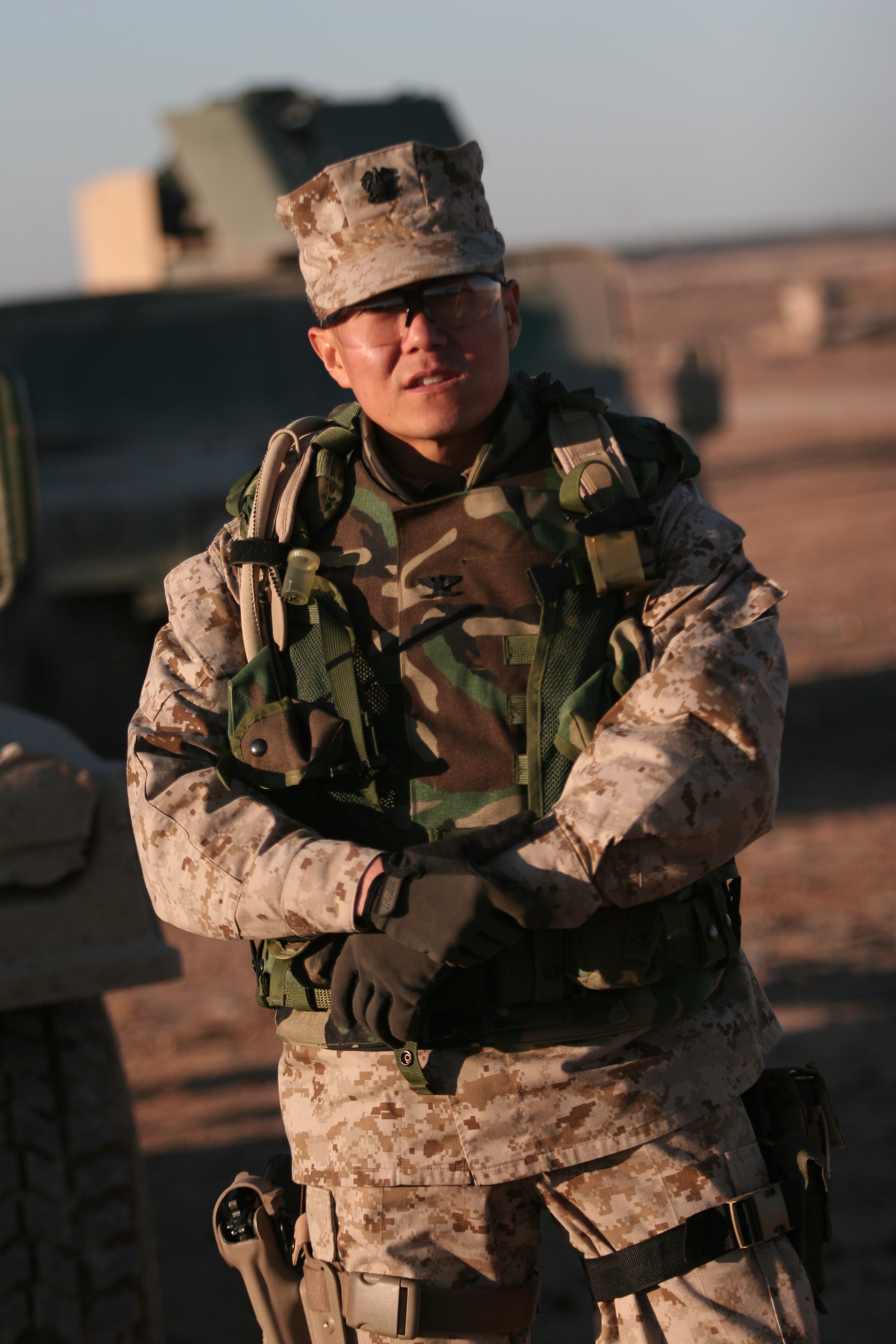
Peter Rhee, EPR researcher (2006)

Peter Safar, the "father of CPR", and Samuel Tisherman began researching EPR in Pittsburgh in the 1980s, publishing their first results in 1990. New Scientist credits the first demonstration of "swiftly replacing blood with salt water – cooling and effectively 'killing them' to save them" to trials on pigs by Peter Rhee and colleagues at the University of Arizona in 2000. Tisherman continued animal experiments following Safar's death in 2003. Tisherman's research was aided by funding from the Department of Defense, which hopes to someday use EPR to treat soldiers in the field.

== Theory ==
When a cardiac arrest patient arrives at an emergency department with gunshot or stab wounds, doctors have mere minutes to repair wounds and perform necessary resuscitative protocols. EPR is an experimental technique that attempts to improve the odds of survival by dropping the patient's temperature to approximately 10 °C, giving the doctor more time to find and stop the source of the bleeding before brain death occurs. Without oxygen, cells ordinarily can survive around two minutes at normal body temperatures; at EPR temperatures, metabolic rates slow down so that cells can survive for hours. In one EPR protocol, blood is replaced with a 10 °C saline solution using a catheter. The surgeon has perhaps an hour to repair the wound. A heart-lung bypass machine then restarts the blood flow. Next the patient is partially warmed up to about 34 °C, for 12 hours.

In one experiment performed around 2006, 12 of 14 dogs survived EPR, whereas 0 of 7 dogs survived the CPR control group. EPR can utilize equipment like catheters and pumps found in any trauma center.

In the future, advances in technology might allow a paramedic to use EPR in the field until a patient can be taken to hospital.

== Human trials ==
Regulatory approval is complicated by the fact that victims of trauma and cardiac arrest are incapacitated and therefore unable to personally consent to experimental treatment; therefore stringent "community consent" guidelines must be fulfilled in order to gain approval for the experimental EPR operation. Where community consent is obtained, as of 2014, the procedure can only be performed on patients 18 to 65 years old who have a penetrating wound, go into cardiac arrest within five minutes of arrival, and fail to respond to ordinary resuscitation efforts. According to Tisherman, "The patient will probably have already lost about 50 percent of their blood and their chest will be open." Their chance of survival without EPR is less than 7 percent: "When patients have bled so much that the heart stops, we know that we have very little chance of saving them." Tisherman hopes EPR can double the non-EPR survival rate. Tisherman officially launched the round of human trials in April 2014 at the University of Pittsburgh, but was stymied by a lack of qualifying patients; he resumed human trials in Baltimore, which has a higher homicide rate, around 2016. In 2018, Tisherman estimated that results would be available within the next two years.

Samuel Tisherman, a professor at the University of Maryland School of Medicine, is the leader of a team that has successfully put a human being in suspended animation. Describing the successful operation as "a little surreal," Professor Tisherman in November 2019 told how he removed the patient's blood and replaced with ice-cold saline solution. The patient, technically dead at this point, was removed from the cooling system and taken to an operating theatre for a two-hour surgical procedure before having their blood restored and being warmed to the normal temperature of 37C. Prof Tisherman says he will be producing a full account of the procedure in a scientific paper in 2020.

As of June 2026, the only EPR human trial was terminated due to slow enrollment, low probability of benefit to the patient and logistical difficulties.

== See also ==
- Deep hypothermic circulatory arrest
