= Cinaciguat =

Chemical compound

Clinical data
- Routes of administration: intravenous (?)
- ATC code: none

Identifiers
- IUPAC name: 4-({(4-carboxybutyl)[2-(2-{[4-(2-phenylethyl) phenyl]methoxy}phenyl)ethyl]amino}methyl) benzoic acid
- CAS Number: 329773-35-5
- PubChem CID: 9808022
- IUPHAR/BPS: 5168
- ChemSpider: 7983781
- UNII: 59K0Y58UAD
- ChEBI: CHEBI:142433
- CompTox Dashboard (EPA): DTXSID40954614

Chemical and physical data
- Formula: C_{36}H_{39}NO_{5}
- Molar mass: 565.710 g·mol^{−1}
- 3D model (JSmol): Interactive image
- SMILES: c4ccccc4CCc3ccc(cc3)COc1ccccc1CCN(CCCCC(O)=O)Cc2ccc(C(=O)O)cc2
- InChI: InChI=1S/C36H39NO5/c38-35(39)12-6-7-24-37(26-30-19-21-33(22-20-30)36(40)41)25-23-32-10-4-5-11-34(32)42-27-31-17-15-29(16-18-31)14-13-28-8-2-1-3-9-28/h1-5,8-11,15-22H,6-7,12-14,23-27H2,(H,38,39)(H,40,41); Key:WPYWMXNXEZFMAK-UHFFFAOYSA-N

Cinaciguat (BAY 58-2667) is an experimental drug for the treatment of acute decompensated heart failure.

== Mechanism of action ==
Cinaciguat activates the soluble guanylate cyclase (sGC) which is a receptor for nitric oxide. This increases biosynthesis of cyclic GMP, resulting in vasodilation.

== See also ==
- Riociguat, another drug stimulating sGC, but with a different mechanism
- PDE5 inhibitors act further downstream in the nitric oxide signalling pathway, reducing cyclic GMP degradation.
