= Suspended animation =

Slowing or stopping of life without death

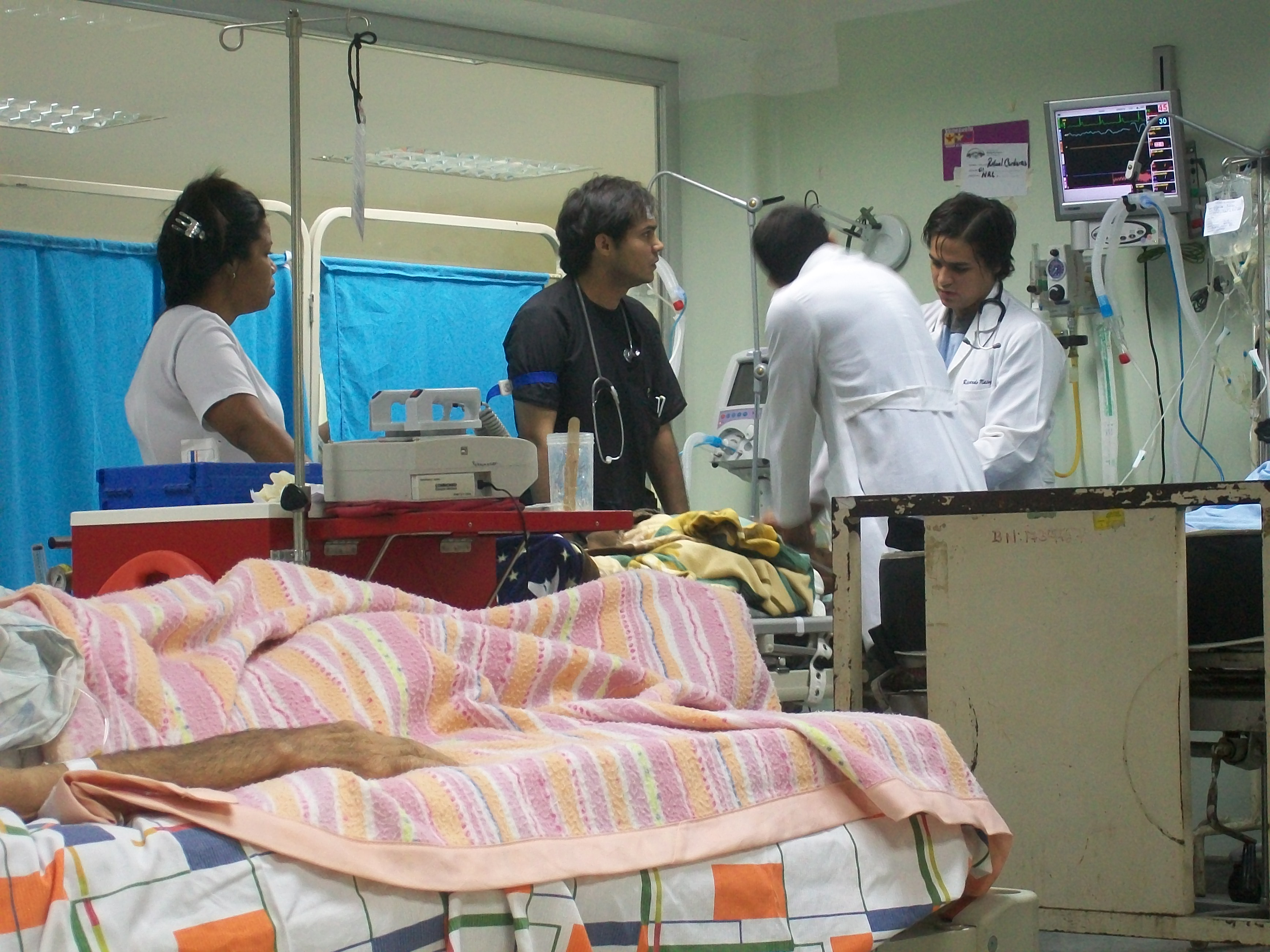
Cardiopulmonary resuscitation (CPR) being performed on a trauma patient in a hospital of Maracay, Venezuela. Like CPR, suspended animation could delay the onset of cell death (necrosis) in seriously injured or ill patients, providing them with more time to receive definitive medical treatment.

Suspended animation is the slowing or stopping of biological function so that physiological capabilities are preserved. States of suspended animation are common in micro-organisms and some plant tissue, such as seeds. Many animals, including large ones, may undergo hibernation, and most plants have periods of dormancy. This article focuses primarily on the potential of large animals, especially humans, to undergo suspended animation.

In animals, suspended animation may be either hypometabolic or ametabolic in nature. It may be induced by either endogenous, natural or artificial biological, chemical or physical means. In its natural form, it may be spontaneously reversible as in the case of species demonstrating hypometabolic states of hibernation. When applied with therapeutic intent, as in deep hypothermic circulatory arrest (DHCA), usually technologically mediated revival is required.

== Basic principles ==
Suspended animation is understood as the pausing of life processes by external or internal means without terminating life itself. Breathing, heartbeat and other involuntary functions may still occur, but they can only be detected by artificial means. For this reason, this procedure has been associated with a lethargic state in nature when animals or plants appear, over a period, to be dead but then can wake up or prevail without suffering any harm. This has been termed in different contexts hibernation, dormancy or anabiosis (the latter in some aquatic invertebrates and plants in scarcity conditions).

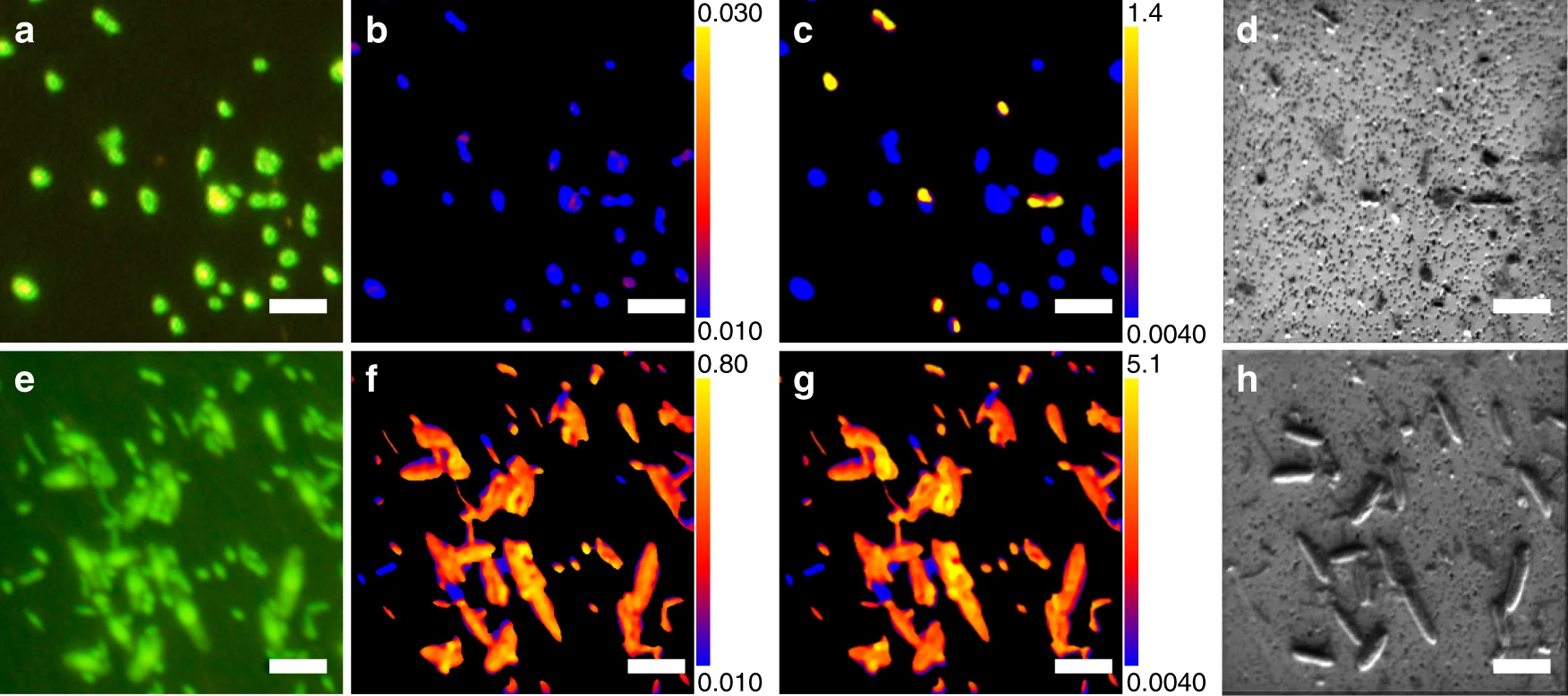
Revived microbial life in very old marine sediment

In July 2020, marine biologists reported that aerobic microorganisms (mainly), in "quasi-suspended animation", were found in organically-poor sediments, up to 101.5 million years old, 68.9 metres (226 feet) below the sea floor in the South Pacific Gyre (SPG) ("the deadest spot in the ocean"), and could be the longest-living life forms ever found.

== Delayed resuscitation in humans ==
This condition of apparent death or interruption of vital signs in humans may be similar to a medical interpretation of suspended animation. It is only possible to recover signs of life if the brain and other vital organs suffer no cell deterioration, necrosis or molecular death principally caused by oxygen deprivation or excess temperature (especially high temperature).

Cases have been reported of individuals having returned from this apparent interruption of life lasting over one half hour, two hours, eight hours, or more (while adhering to these specific conditions for oxygen and temperature) have been analysed in depth, but these cases are considered rare and unusual phenomena. The brain begins to die after five minutes without oxygen; nervous tissues die intermediately when a "somatic death" occurs while muscles die over one to two hours following this last condition.

It has been possible to obtain a successful resuscitation and recover life after apparent suspended animation in such instances as after anaesthesia, heat stroke, electrocution, narcotic poisoning, heart attack or cardiac arrest, shock, newborn infants, cerebral concussion, or cholera.

Supposedly, in suspended animation, a person technically would not die, as long as they were able to preserve the minimum conditions in an environment extremely close to death and return to a normal living state. An example of such a case is Anna Bågenholm, a Swedish radiologist who allegedly survived 80 minutes under ice in a frozen lake in a state of cardiac arrest with no brain damage in 1999.

Other cases of hypothermia where people survived without damage are:

- John Smith, a 14-year-old boy who survived 15 minutes under ice in a frozen lake before paramedics arrived to pull him onto dry land and saved him.
- Mitsutaka Uchikoshi, a Japanese man, was reported by media to have survived the cold for 24 days in 2006 without food or water when he purportedly fell into a state similar to hibernation. This was doubted by some medical experts, claiming that surviving such a prolonged period without fluids was physiologically impossible.
- Paulie Hynek, who, at age two, survived several hours of hypothermia-induced cardiac arrest and whose body temperature reached 18 °C (64 °F).
- Erika Nordby, a toddler who in 2001 was revived after two hours without apparent heartbeat with a body temperature of about 16 °C (61 °F).

=== Human hibernation ===
It has been suggested that bone lesions provide evidence of hibernation among the early human population whose remains have been retrieved at the Archaeological site of Atapuerca. In a paper published in the journal L'Anthropologie, researchers Juan-Luis Arsuaga and Antonis Bartsiokas point out that "primitive mammals and primates" like bush babies and lorises hibernate, which suggests that "the genetic basis and physiology for such a hypometabolism could be preserved in many mammalian species, including humans".

Since the 1970s, induced hypothermia has been performed for some open-heart surgeries as an alternative to heart-lung machines. Hypothermia, however, provides only a limited amount of time in which to operate and there is a risk of tissue and brain damage for prolonged periods.

There are many research projects currently investigating how to achieve "induced hibernation" in humans. This ability to hibernate humans would be useful for a number of reasons, such as saving the lives of seriously ill or injured people by temporarily putting them in a state of hibernation until treatment can be given.

The primary focus of research for human hibernation is to reach a state of torpor, defined as a gradual physiological inhibition to reduce oxygen demand and obtain energy conservation by hypometabolic behaviors altering biochemical processes. In previous studies, it was demonstrated that physiological and biochemical events could inhibit endogenous thermoregulation before the onset of hypothermia in a challenging process known as "estivation". This is indispensable to survive harsh environmental conditions, as seen in some amphibians and reptiles.

== Scientific possibilities ==
=== Temperature-induced ===
Lowering the temperature of a substance reduces its chemical activity by the Arrhenius equation. This includes life processes such as metabolism. Cryonics could eventually provide long-term suspended animation.

==== Emergency Preservation and Resuscitation ====
Emergency Preservation and Resuscitation (EPR) is a way to slow the bodily processes that would lead to death in cases of severe injury. This involves lowering the body's temperature below 34 °C (93 °F), which is the current standard for therapeutic hypothermia.

==== Hypothermic experiments on animals ====
In June 2005, scientists at the University of Pittsburgh's Safar Center for Resuscitation Research announced they had managed to place dogs in suspended animation and bring them back to life, most of them without brain damage, by draining the blood out of the dogs' bodies and injecting a low temperature solution into their circulatory systems, which in turn keeps the bodies alive in stasis. After three hours of being clinically dead, the dogs' blood was returned to their circulatory systems, and the animals were revived by delivering an electric shock to their hearts. The heart started pumping the blood around the body, and the dogs were brought back to life.

On 20 January 2006, doctors from the Massachusetts General Hospital in Boston announced they had placed pigs in suspended animation with a similar technique. The pigs were anaesthetized and major blood loss was induced, along with simulated - via scalpel - severe injuries (e.g. a punctured aorta as might happen in a car accident or shooting). After the pigs lost about half their blood the remaining blood was replaced with a chilled saline solution. As the body temperature reached 10 °C (50 °F) the damaged blood vessels were repaired and the blood was returned. The method was tested 200 times with a 90% success rate.

=== Chemically induced ===
The laboratory of Mark Roth at the Fred Hutchinson Cancer Research Center and institutes such as Suspended Animation, Inc are trying to implement suspended animation as a medical procedure which involves the therapeutic induction to a complete and temporary systemic ischemia, directed to obtain a state of tolerance for the protection-preservation of the entire organism, this during a circulatory collapse "only by a limited period of one hour". The purpose is to avoid a serious injury, risk of brain damage or death, until the patient reaches specialized attention.

== See also ==
- Brain death
- Coma
- Cryptobiosis
- Immortality
- Life extension
- Stasis
- Suspended animation in fiction
- Technological utopianism
