= Fausto Lopo de Carvalho =

Portuguese physician

Fausto Lopo de Carvalho GOSE GOIP
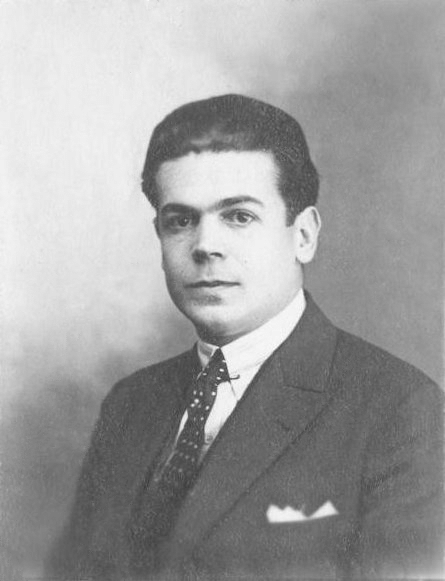
- Born: Fausto Lopo Patrício de Carvalho; 15 May 1890; Guarda, Portugal
- Died: 23 May 1970 (aged 80); Alcântara, Lisbon, Portugal
- Education: University of Coimbra
- Known for: Pulmonary angiography
- Spouse: Fernanda de Abreu Caroça (m. 1917–1970)
- Scientific career
- Fields: Pneumophthisiology

Fausto Lopo Patrício de Carvalho GOSE GOIP (15 May 1890 – 23 May 1970), more commonly known as Fausto Lopo de Carvalho, was a Portuguese pulmonologist specialising in phthisiology, and the developer of pulmonary angiography in 1931, with Egas Moniz and Almeida Lima.

He was the son of eminent phthisiologist Lopo de Carvalho (founder of the first sanatorium in Portugal, in Guarda), and his wife Leopoldina dos Anjos Patrício de Carvalho. He studied at the University of Coimbra, earning a degree in medicine with the highest possible grade (20 out of a possible 20) in 1916; after completing his medical studies he worked at the Guarda Sanatorium under his father's guidance, where he prepared his thesis for a doctorate, entitled Artificial Pneumothorax. He taught Medical Propaedeutics, first at the Faculty of Medicine of the University of Coimbra and later at the Faculty of Medicine of the University of Lisbon, until 1934, when he was appointed to the newly created Chair of Chest Diseases.

He was President of the International Union Against Tuberculosis from 1937 to 1939, and also presided over the Portuguese National Assistance for the Tuberculous from 1931 to 1938.

== Distinctions ==
=== National orders ===
- Grand Officer of the Order of Saint James of the Sword (7 February 1985)
- Grand Officer of the Order of Public Instruction (5 October 1931)

=== Foreign orders ===
- Commander of the Order of Leopold (Belgium)
- Officer of the Legion of Honour (France)
- Knight of the Order of Charles III (Spain)
