= Mark Roth (scientist) =

American biochemist

- Born: 1957 (age 68–69)
- Education: University of Oregon; University of Colorado Boulder
- Spouse: Laurie Roth
- Awards: MacArthur Fellows Program
- Scientific career
- Fields: Biochemist
- Workplaces: Fred Hutchinson Cancer Research Center

Mark Roth (born 1957) is an American biochemist, and director of the Roth Lab at the Fred Hutchinson Cancer Research Center. He is a professor at the University of Washington.

== Life ==
He graduated from the University of Oregon with a Bachelor of Science in 1979, and from the University of Colorado Boulder with a Doctor of Philosophy in 1984. He studies hibernation and suspended animation. This technology is not likely to be used for long term suspension of people or other mammals any time soon.

Roth spoke at the 2010 TED conference in February on using hydrogen sulfide to achieve suspended animation in humans as a means of increasing the success rate of cardiac surgery. The clinical trials commissioned by the company he founded, Ikaria, were however withdrawn or terminated by August 2011. In 2014, Roth founded Faraday Pharmaceuticals, which has produced similar trials for compounds intended to alter human metabolism.

He is married to Laurie; they had two daughters and a son.

== Awards ==
- 2007 MacArthur Fellows Program
