= Deep hypothermic circulatory arrest =

Surgical technique using deep hypothermia

Deep hypothermic circulatory arrest (DHCA) is a surgical technique in which the temperature of the body falls significantly (between 20 °C (68 °F) to 25 °C (77 °F)) and blood circulation is stopped for up to one hour. It is used when blood circulation to the brain must be stopped because of delicate surgery within the brain, or because of surgery on large blood vessels that lead to or from the brain. DHCA is used to provide a better visual field during surgery due to the cessation of blood flow. DHCA is a form of carefully managed clinical death in which heartbeat and all brain activity cease.

When blood circulation stops at normal body temperature (37 °C), permanent damage occurs in only a few minutes. More damage occurs after circulation is restored. Reducing body temperature extends the time interval that such stoppage can be survived. At a brain temperature of 14 °C, blood circulation can be safely stopped for 30 to 40 minutes. There is an increased incidence of brain injury at times longer than 40 minutes, but sometimes circulatory arrest for up to 60 minutes is used if life-saving surgery requires it. Infants tolerate longer periods of DHCA than adults.

Applications of DHCA include repairs of the aortic arch, repairs to head and neck great vessels, repair of large cerebral aneurysms, repair of cerebral arteriovenous malformations, pulmonary thromboendarterectomy, and resection of tumors that have invaded the vena cava.

== History ==
The use of hypothermia for medical purposes dates back to Hippocrates, who advocated packing snow and ice into wounds to reduce hemorrhage. The origin of hypothermia and neuroprotection was also observed in infants who were exposed to cold due to abandonment and the prolonged viability of these infants.

In the 1940s and 1950s, Canadian surgeon Wilfred Bigelow demonstrated in animal models that the length of time the brain could survive stopped blood circulation could be extended from 3 minutes to 10 minutes by cooling to 30 °C before circulation was stopped. He found that this time could be extended to 15 to 24 minutes at temperatures below 20 °C. He further found that at a temperature of 5 °C, groundhogs could endure two hours of stopped blood circulation without ill effects. This research was motivated by a desire to stop the heart from beating long enough to do surgery on the heart while it remained still. Since heart-lung machines, also known as cardiopulmonary bypass (CPB), had not been invented yet, stopping the heart meant stopping blood circulation to the whole body, including the brain.

The first heart surgery using hypothermia to provide a longer time that blood circulation through the whole body could be safely stopped was performed by F. John Lewis and Mansur Taufic at the University of Minnesota in 1952. In this procedure, the first successful open heart surgery, Lewis repaired an atrial septal defect in a 5-year-old girl during 5 minutes of total circulatory arrest at 28 °C. Many similar procedures were performed by Soviet heart surgeon Eugene Meshalkin in Novosibirsk during the 1960s. In these procedures, cooling was accomplished externally by applying cold water or melting ice to the surface of the body.

The advent of cardiopulmonary bypass in the United States during the 1950s allowed the heart to be stopped for surgery without having to stop circulation to the rest of the body. Cooling more than a few degrees was no longer needed for heart surgery. Thereafter, the only surgeries that required stopping blood circulation to the whole body ("total circulatory arrest") were surgeries involving blood supply to the brain. The only heart surgeries that continued to require total circulatory arrest were repairs to the aortic arch.

Cardiopulmonary bypass machines were essential to the development of deep hypothermic circulatory arrest (DHCA) in humans. By 1959, it was known from the animal experiments of Bigelow, Andjus and Smith, Gollan, Lewis's colleague, Niazi, and others that temperatures near 0 °C could be survived by mammals, and that colder temperature permitted the brain to survive longer circulatory arrest times, even beyond one hour. Humans had survived cooling to 9 °C, and circulatory arrest of 45 minutes, using external cooling only. However, reaching such low temperatures by external cooling was difficult and hazardous. At temperatures below 24 °C, the human heart is prone to fibrillation and stopping. This can begin circulatory arrest before the brain has reached a safe temperature. Cardiopulmonary bypass machines allow blood circulation and cooling to continue below the temperature at which the heart stops working. By cooling blood directly, cardiopulmonary bypass also cools people faster than surface cooling, even if the heart is not functioning.

In 1959, using cardiopulmonary bypass (CPB), Barnes Woodhall and colleagues at Duke Medical Center performed the first brain surgery using DHCA, a tumor resection, at a brain temperature of 11 °C and esophageal temperature of 4 °C. This was quickly followed by use of DHCA by Alfred Uihlein and other surgeons for treatment of large cerebral aneurysms, another neurosurgical procedure, for which DHCA is still used today. In 1963, Christiaan Barnard and Velva Schrire were the first to use DHCA to repair an aortic aneurysm, cooling the patient to 10 °C. Randall B. Griepp, in 1975, is generally credited with demonstrating DHCA as a safe and practical approach for aortic arch surgery.

== Mechanism of brain protection ==
Cells require energy to operate membrane ion pumps and other mechanisms of cellular homeostasis. Cold reduces the metabolic rate of cells, which conserves energy stores (ATP) and oxygen needed to produce energy. Cold therefore extends the length of time that cells can maintain homeostasis and avoid damaging hypoxia and anaerobic glycolysis by conserving local resources when blood circulation is stopped and unable to deliver fresh oxygen and glucose to make more energy.

Normally 60% of brain oxygen utilization (CMRO2) consists of energy generation for the neuronal action potentials of brain electrical activity.

A key principle of DHCA is total inactivation of the brain by cooling, as verified by "flatline" isoelectric EEG, also called electrocerebral silence (ECS). Instead of a continuous decrease in activity as the brain is cooled, electrical activity decreases in discontinuous steps. In the human brain, a type of reduced activity called burst suppression occurs at a mean temperature of 24 °C, and electrocerebral silence occurs at a mean temperature of 18 °C. The achievement of measured electrocerebral silence has been called "a safe and reliable guide" for determining cooling required for individual patients, and verification of electrocerebral silence is required prior to stopping blood circulation to begin a DHCA procedure.

Secondary to conservation of local energy resources by metabolic slowing and brain inactivation, hypothermia also protects the brain from injury by other mechanisms during stopped blood circulation. These include reduction of free radicals and immune-inflammatory processes.

== Temperatures used ==
Mild hypothermia (32 °C to 34 °C) and moderate hypothermia (26 °C to 31 °C) are contraindicated for hypothermic circulatory arrest because 100% and 75% of people respectively will not achieve electrocerebral silence in these temperature ranges. Consequently, safe circulatory arrest times for mild and moderate hypothermia are only 10 and 20 minutes respectively. While moderate hypothermia may be satisfactory for short surgeries, deep hypothermia (20 °C to 25 °C) affords protection for times of 30 to 40 minutes at the bottom of this temperature range.

Profound hypothermia (< 14 °C) usually isn't used clinically. It is a subject of research in animals and human clinical trials. As of 2012, the lowest body temperature ever survived by a human being was 9 °C (48 °F) as part of a hypothermic circulatory arrest experiment to treat cancer in 1957. This temperature was reached without surgery, using external cooling alone. Similar low temperatures are expected to be reached in emergency preservation and resuscitation (EPR) clinical trials described in the Research section of this article.

== Cooling techniques ==
Since the benefits of hypothermia were discovered there have been numerous methods used to cool the body to desired temperatures. Hippocrates used snow and ice to surface cool wounded patients to prevent excessive bleeding. This method would fall under conventional cooling techniques, in which cold saline and crushed ice are used to induce a state of hypothermia to the patient. These techniques are inexpensive but lack the precision needed to maintain target temperatures and require careful monitoring. It has been proven to help prevent undesirable rewarming of the brain during DHCA. Hospitals and emergency medical services commonly use surface cooling systems that circulate cold air or water around blankets or pads. Advantages of this method are accuracy of cooling due to auto-regulating temperature control, feedback probes, applicable in non-hospital settings, and non-complexity of use. Drawbacks to surface cooling systems is skin irritation, shivering and rate of cooling. Intravascular cooling systems regulate temperature from inside veins such as the femoral, sub-clavian, or internal jugular to reduce adverse effects that external cooling methods cause. This method is unparalleled in achieving and maintaining the target temperature desired. The use of continuous renal replacement therapy (CRRT) has proven effective in the induction of hypothermia as an intravascular cooling system.

== Method ==
People who are to undergo DHCA surgery are placed on cardiopulmonary bypass (CPB), a procedure that uses an external heart-lung machine that can artificially replace the function of the heart and lungs. A portion of the circulating blood supply is removed and stored for later replacement, with the remaining blood diluted by added fluids with the objective of reducing viscosity and clotting tendencies at cold temperature. The remaining diluted blood is cooled by the heart-lung machine until hypothermia causes the heart to stop beating normally, after which the blood pump of the heart-lung machine continues blood circulation through the body. Corticosteroids are typically given 6–8 hours before surgery as it has shown to have neuroprotective properties to decrease risk of neurological dysfunction by decreasing the release of inflammatory cytokines. Glucose is eliminated from all intravenous solutions to reduce the risk of hyperglycemia. In order for accurate hemodynamic monitoring, arterial monitoring is typically placed in the femoral or radial artery. Temperature taken from two separate sites, typically the bladder and nasopharynx, is used to estimate brain and body temperatures. Cardioplegic drugs may be administered to ensure the heart stops beating completely (asystole), which is protective of both the heart and brain when circulation is later stopped. Cooling continues until the brain is inactivated by the cold, and electrocerebral silence (flatline EEG) is attained. The blood pump is then switched off, and the interval of circulatory arrest begins. At this time more blood is drained to reduce residual blood pressure if surgery on a cerebral aneurysm is to be performed to help create a bloodless surgical field.

After surgery is completed during the period of cold circulatory arrest, these steps are reversed. The brain and heart naturally resume activity as warming proceeds. The first activity of the warming heart is sometimes ventricular fibrillation requiring cardioversion to re-establish a normal beating rhythm. Except for the period of complete inactivation just prior to and during the circulatory arrest interval, barbiturate infusion is used to keep the brain in a state of burst suppression for the entirety of the DHCA procedure until emergence from anesthesia. Hypothermic perfusion is maintained for 10–20 minutes while on CPB before rewarming as to reduce the risk of increased intracranial pressure. Warming must be done carefully to avoid overshooting normal body temperature. It is recommended that rewarming is stopped once the body is warmed to 37 °C. Post-operative hyperthermia is associated with adverse outcomes. Patients are completely rewarmed before discontinuing CPB, but temperature remain labile despite rewarming efforts which requires close monitoring in the ICU.

== Complications ==
The use of hypothermia following cardiac arrest shows increased likelihood of survival. It is the re-warming period that, if not controlled properly, can have detrimental effects. Hyperthermia during the re-warming period shows unfavorable neurologic outcomes. For each degree the body is warmed above 37 °C, there is an increased association with severe disability, coma, or vegetative states. Excessive rewarming with temperatures above 37 °C can increase the risk of cerebral ischemia secondary to the increased oxygen demand that occurs with rapid rewarming. Several theories have been proposed, with one being during re-warming, the body releases increasing catecholamines which increase heat production leading to a loss of thermoregulation. Hyperthermia in the preperfusion period can also be caused by an increase in the production of oxygen radicals, which influences brain metabolism. These oxygen radicals attack cell membranes, leading to a disruption of intracellular organelles and subsequent cellular death.

Virtually all patients who undergo DHCA develop impaired glucose metabolism and require insulin to control blood sugars. Thrombocytopenia and clotting factor deficiencies prove to be a significant cause of early death after DHCA. Careful monitoring intra-procedure and post-procedure is needed.

Although DHCA is necessary for some procedures, the use of anesthesia can provide optimum operation time and organ protection but can also have serious impacts on cellular demand, brain cells, and serious systemic inflammatory results. Possible disadvantages of DHCA includes alteration in organ functions of the liver, kidney, brain, pancreas, intestines and smooth muscles due to cellular damage. Permanent neurological injury has been seen in 3-12% of patients when using DHCA. Cases of partial or complete limb motor loss, impaired language, visual defects, and cognitive decline have all been reported as consequences of DHCA. Other neurological complications include increased risk for seizures postoperative due to delayed return of cellular blood flow to the brain. When compared to Moderate Hypothermia (temperature dropped to 26-31 °C), there was less bleeding volume experienced during surgery thus leading to less use of packed red blood cells or plasma post surgery. Longer recovery time postoperatively have been noted with DHCA as compared to Moderate Hypothermia, but the length of hospital stay and death has no correlated difference. Most patients can tolerate 30 minutes of DHCA without significant neurological dysfunction or adverse effects, but after an extended period of 40 minutes or more, prevalence of increased brain injury have been noted.

== Research ==
One of the anticipated medical uses of long circulatory arrest times, or so-called clinical suspended animation, is treatment of traumatic injury. In 1984 CPR pioneer Peter Safar and U.S. Army surgeon Ronald Bellamy proposed suspended animation by hypothermic circulatory arrest as a way of saving people who had exsanguinated from traumatic injuries to the trunk of the body. Exsanguination is blood loss severe enough to cause death. Until the 1980s, it had been thought impossible to resuscitate people whose heart stopped because of blood loss, resulting in these people being declared dead when cardiac resuscitation failed. Traditional treatments such as CPR and fluid replacement or blood transfusion are not effective when cardiac arrest has already occurred and bleeding remains uncontrolled. Safar and Bellamy proposed flushing cold solution through blood vessels of patients with deadly bleeding, and leaving them in a state of cold circulatory arrest with the heart stopped until the cause of bleeding could be surgically repaired to allow later resuscitation. In preclinical studies at the University of Pittsburgh during the 1990s, the process was called deep hypothermia for preservation and resuscitation, and then suspended animation for delayed resuscitation.

The process of cooling people with fatal bleeding for surgical repair and later resuscitation was finally called Emergency Preservation and Resuscitation for Cardiac Arrest from Trauma (EPR-CAT), or EPR. It is presently undergoing human clinical trials. In the trials, patients who experience clinical death for less than five minutes duration from blood loss are being cooled from normal body temperature of 37 °C to less than 10 °C by pumping a large quantity of ice-cold saline into the largest blood vessel of the body (aorta). By remaining in circulatory arrest at temperatures below 10 °C (50 °F), it is believed that surgeons have one to two hours to fix injuries before circulation must be restarted. Surgeons involved with this research have said that EPR changes the definition of death for victims of this type of trauma.

A 2021 study of 101 patients that underwent Deep hypothermic circulatory arrest found that none of them had anything that could be described as a Near-Death Experience.

== See also ==
- Continuity of consciousness
- Clinical death
- Targeted temperature management
- Suspended animation
- Emergency Preservation and Resuscitation
