= Jesse Koochin =

American child (1998–2004)

Jesse Steven Koochin (April 15, 1998 – November 19, 2004) was a 6-year-old American boy who became the center of a legal battle between his parents, Steve and Gayle Koochin, and Primary Children's Medical Center in Salt Lake City.

== Biography ==
Jesse Koochin was born in Dunedin, Florida the youngest of four children born to Steve and Gayle Koochin, and resided in Clearwater. His parents were Scientologists. His mother worked as a graphic designer and his father as an engineer.

== Cancer diagnosis and treatment ==
Shortly after his sixth birthday, Jesse was diagnosed with an "inoperable and incurable" brain tumor— medulloblastoma with metastasis to the brain and spine—on April 19, 2004. His parents sought holistic treatment in three states, including Georgia, where they agreed to try standard radiation treatment as his condition worsened. However, Jesse's condition was determined to be too advanced for radiation or chemotherapy, so his parents took him to another alternative clinic in Mexico for treatment. His parents claimed he improved in Mexico from the alternative treatment. The Mexican treatment included "injecting him with live cells from the embryo of a blue shark and placing an ointment on his head, which his father described as killing and pulling out the tumors."

The Koochins then sought more holistic treatment at the Modern Health Clinic in Bountiful, Utah, but the clinic determined he was too ill for treatment. On September 15, 2004, Jesse developed respiratory problems and was taken to Primary Children's Medical Center in Salt Lake City and placed on a ventilator. On October 8, "his tumor pushed his brain stem down through his skull," and he was in an unresponsive coma. Subsequently, two physicians independently examined him on October 11 and 12 and determined that the child was brain dead. The hospital informed his parents that they would order life support removed within 24 hours.

== Legal fight ==
However, the Koochins rejected the hospital's definition of death. Instead, relying on traditional notions of cardiopulmonary death, they filed for an immediate restraining order to keep Koochin on a ventilator and to receive other treatment. They declared that he had been in a "similar coma" from May 23, 2004 to July 11, 2004 and had successfully awakened, and also claimed that the hospital staff did not perform an EEG exam or cerebral perfusion study to test for brain activity. The Utah judge granted the restraining order on October 13 and ruled that the hospital would not be allowed to declare him brain dead without performing the two tests.

On October 15, the parents removed the brain-dead child from the hospital and put him under hospice care at their temporary home in Salt Lake City. Koochin's heart ultimately stopped beating on November 19, 2004.

The landmark case was the first documented instance in the United States in which parents attempted to opt out of legally accepted standards of death.
