= National Hospital Organization Okayama Medical Center =

Hospital in Okayama, Japan

Coordinates: 34.7080°N 133.8995°E

The National Hospital Organization Okayama Medical Center is a medical centre in Okayama, Japan. It is where innovations have taken place in pulmonary hypertension.

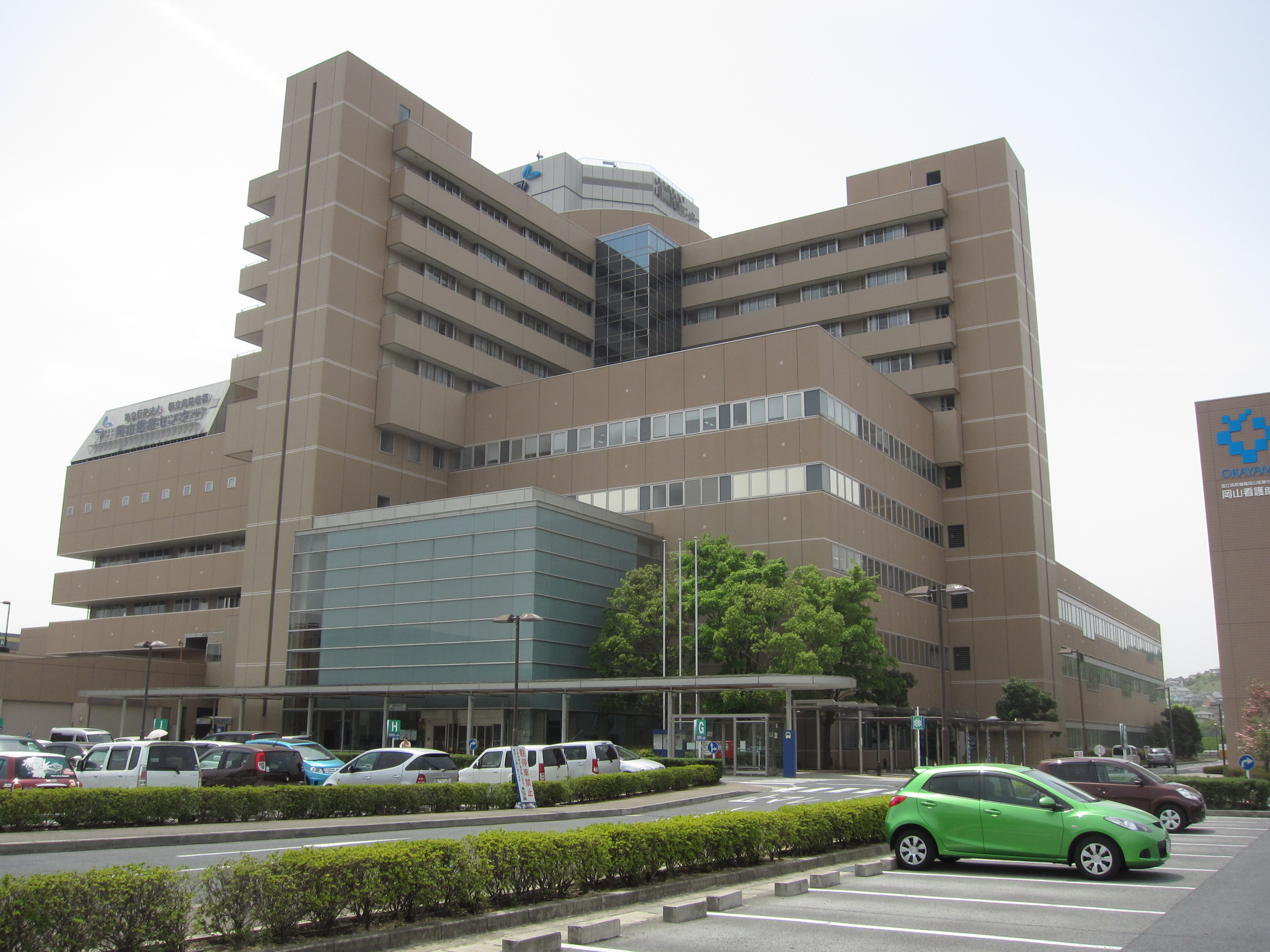
National Hospital Organization Okayama Medical Center
