= Suspended Animation, Inc =

Suspended Animation, Inc (SA) is an American cryonics company founded in 2002 in Boynton Beach, FL. SA's purpose is to preserve bodies immediately after legal death to minimize the damages that occur before the body is cryogenically preserved. SA does not actually perform final cryopreservation, rather, they work with companies such as the Alcor Life Extension Foundation and Cryonics Institute which carry out the cryopreservations. Unlike Alcor Life Extension Foundation and Cryonics Institute, Suspended Animation, Inc does not offer memberships, but rather gains revenue from performing the one-time procedure.
