= Pulmonary thromboendarterectomy =

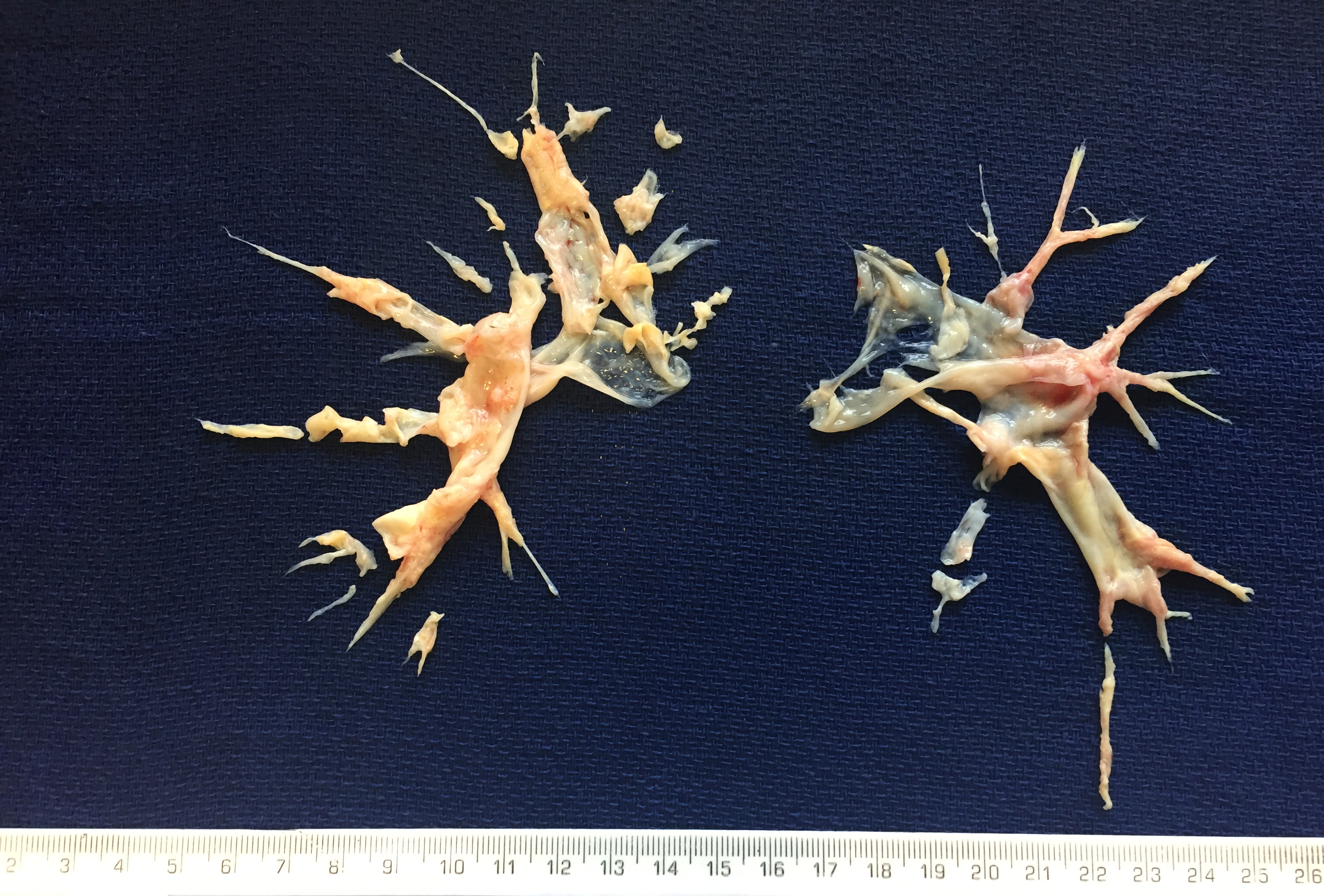
- PTE specimen
- Other names: Pulmonary endarterectomy
- Specialty: Cardiothoracic surgery
- ICD-9-CM: 38.15

In thoracic surgery, a pulmonary thromboendarterectomy (PTE), also referred to as pulmonary endarterectomy (PEA), is an operation that removes organized clotted blood (thrombus) from the pulmonary arteries, which supply blood to the lungs.

== Indication ==
Surgery is indicated in patients with pulmonary artery emboli that are surgically accessible. Thrombi are usually the cause of recurrent/chronic pulmonary emboli and therefore of chronic thromboembolic pulmonary hypertension (CTEPH). PTE is the only definitive treatment option available for CTEPH.

Due to the nature of the procedure, patients with significant hemodynamic or ventilation complications or impairments may be unable to undergo PTE.

== Description of the surgery ==
A PTE has significant risk; mortality for the operation is typically 5%, but less in centers with high volume and experience. Individuals with favorable hemodynamic risk profiles also demonstrate lower mortality rates (1.3%). PTEs are risky because of the nature of the procedure. PTEs involve a full cardiopulmonary bypass (CPB), deep hypothermia and cardioplegia (a crystalline fluid which stops the heart from beating). Actual removal of the embolus is carried out in a standstill operation (deep hypothermia and periods of cessation of circulation).

There are a number of reasons why these high-risk elements of the procedure are necessary. CPB is needed to divert blood from the heart and lungs and supply the body with oxygen and blood while the pulmonary vasculature is operated on. Cardioplegia is initiated as the approach to the pulmonary arteries is performed through the pericardium, a fibrous sac surrounding the heart. Furthermore, movement from the heart makes delicate work on the closely attached pulmonary arteries complex. Hypothermia is necessary as the embolus is very delicate and the risk of disruption is high, in order to appropriately visualize the clot and remove it a bloodless field is required. Clot visualization is achieved through dissection of the pulmonary arteries which is technically challenging. If possible the clot is removed in a single piece to avoid the formation of mobile emboli. In order to achieve this CPB is periodically stopped, resulting in a complete cessation of blood circulation. This is only feasible if the patient is hypothermic (cooled to 18–20 °C) as metabolism is slowed and the body can better tolerate the resulting lack of blood supply. Circulatory arrest is limited to 20 minute intervals to protect brain function. Typically an experienced surgeon can perform an entire unilateral procedure in this time. After each interval of arrest circulation is continued for 10 minutes or until pulmonary venous oxygen saturation is at least 90%. Bypass time is typically 345 minutes.

There are emerging alternative options available that seek to limit neurologic complications resulting from hypothermia and circulatory arrest. Currently these options have not been shown to be superior to the previously described technique. They include use of moderate hypothermia, antegrade cerebral artery perfusion without total circulatory arrest, and negative pressure application to the left ventricle.

Acute pulmonary embolectomy is a dramatically different procedure. It's typically performed without hypothermia as the structure of the clot is different, and the emergent nature presents different operative priorities.

== Recovery and complications ==
Recovery from this procedure can be complex. Thoracic surgery, CBP and cardioplegia are associated with their own complications and management challenges, as is hypothermia. Specifically, endartectomy is associated with reperfusion pulmonary edema and "pulmonary artery steal". Reperfusion pulmonary edema occurs in up to 30% of patients and is a result of changes in permeability to the vascular endothelium. Management of this condition may require the use of supportive ventilation including BiPAP (bidirectional positive airway pressure) and fluid management with diuretics. In patients who are non responsive to this management extra corporeal circulation may be indicated. Each of these strategies are complex and require careful consideration of patient physiology.

Pulmonary artery steal occurs in 70% of patients. It is related to changes in blood flow over areas of pulmonary vasculature that have been newly exposed from the endarectomy. The result is insufficient oxygenation though the mechanism causing this remains obscure. Treatment is supportive with oxygen, and ventilation, and the condition is typically self limiting.

== Post-surgery ==
The benefits of PTEs are significant. Most patients after surgery no longer suffer from shortness of breath and therefore have a much improved quality of life. Further, pulmonary vascular resistance usually drops back to close normal levels. Since the pulmonary resistance is proportional to the pressure driving the pulmonary flow ($P = Q \cdot R$), it follows that the pulmonary pressure decreases. This in turn means that the work per time (power) decreases because it is equal to the pressure gradient times the volumetric flow, which in this case is the cardiac output. As a result of the operation, patients are spared from pulmonary hypertension and further right ventricular hypertrophy. Most pleasing is that patients who previously had right heart dysfunction often recover function.

== History and development ==
As of 2008, the UCSD Medical Center's cardiothoracic surgery department, led by Stuart W. Jamieson, was widely recognized as a pioneer in the relatively new surgery, having performed more PTEs than the rest of the world combined (over 3000 since 1970 out of a total of 4500 worldwide) with the lowest mortality rate.

In the UK, PTE is offered only at one centre, Royal Papworth Hospital, led by surgeon Mr David Jenkins. He is one of just four surgeons in the UK qualified to perform pulmonary endarterectomy surgery, all based at Royal Papworth, which is one of the most active centres in the world for this operation with approximately 190 operations performed each year and a total caseload since 1996 of more than 2,000.

The operation features in a BBC Two documentary called 'Surgeons: At the Edge of Life', broadcast on Tuesday 6 October 2020. The footage shows the patient's entire body being drained of blood and cooled to 20 degrees Celsius – half the normal temperature – in order to enable the surgery to occur.

== Relation to pulmonary thrombectomies ==
PTEs and pulmonary thrombectomies are both operations that removed thrombus from the lung's arterial vasculature. Aside from this similarity they differ in many ways.

- PTEs are done on a nonemergency basis while pulmonary thrombectomies are typically done as an emergency procedure.
- PTEs typically are done using hypothermia and full circulatory arrest.
- PTEs are done for chronic pulmonary embolism, thrombectomies for severe acute pulmonary embolism.
- PTEs are generally considered a very effective treatment, surgical thrombectomies are an area of some controversy and their effectiveness a matter of some debate in the medical community.

== See also ==
- Deep hypothermic circulatory arrest
