= Asthma-COPD overlap =

Chronic inflammatory and obstructive disease of the lungs

- Specialty: Pulmonology
- Symptoms: wheezing, coughing, dyspnea, sputum production
- Usual onset: Adulthood
- Duration: Long term
- Causes: Genetic and environmental factors
- Risk factors: smoking, air pollution, allergens
- Diagnostic method: Based on symptoms, response to therapy, spirometry
- Treatment: Avoiding triggers, inhaled corticosteroids, bronchodilators

Asthma-Chronic Obstructive Pulmonary Disease (COPD) Overlap (ACO), also known as Asthma-COPD Overlap Syndrome (ACOS), is a chronic inflammatory, obstructive airway disease in which features of both asthma and COPD predominate. Asthma and COPD were once thought of as distinct entities; however, in some, there are clinical features of both asthma and COPD with significant overlap in pathophysiology and symptom profile. It is unclear whether ACO is a separate disease entity or a clinical subtype of asthma and COPD. The pathogenesis of ACO is poorly understood, but it is thought to involve both type 2 inflammation (usually seen in asthma) as well as type 1 inflammation (seen in COPD). The incidence and prevalence of ACO are not well known. The risk factors for ACO are also incompletely understood, but tobacco smoke is known to be a major risk factor.

== Signs and symptoms ==
ACO presents with symptoms of both asthma and COPD. ACO presents in adulthood, usually after the age of 40 (after there has been significant tobacco smoke or other toxic fumes exposure), with symptoms of dyspnea (shortness of breath), exercise intolerance, sputum production, cough and episodes of symptomatic worsening known as exacerbations.

== Cause ==
A history of significant and persistent noxious fumes exposure is required for the diagnosis of COPD; therefore, it is also required for the diagnosis of ACO. This can be due to tobacco smoking, indoor air pollution, or outdoor air pollution.

== Pathophysiology ==
ACOS presents with features of both asthma and COPD. Both asthma and COPD (as well as ACO) present with exacerbations, periods where symptoms deteriorate, with marked reductions in airflow. However, in asthma, the airflow limitation usually completely resolves after exacerbations, whereas in COPD it may not. ACO presents with a chronic airflow limitation or obstruction (due to inflammation), with characteristics of both asthma and COPD. Inflammation of the large and medium airways (classically seen with asthma) is seen in ACO. This consists of bronchoconstriction due to smooth muscle spasm as well as smooth muscle hyperresponsiveness (due to allergens or irritants) causing obstruction of airflow. Mucus production and inflammation in the airways can also cause airflow obstruction in asthma.

Features of COPD (which includes the subtypes of chronic bronchitis and COPD) are also seen in ACO. These include the features of chronic bronchitis such as inflammation of the small airways and mucus production or hypersecretion. Peribronchial inflammation may lead to fibrosis (obliterative bronchiolitis) as well as features of emphysema, including inflammation leading to alveolar destruction resulting in lung hyperinflation and air trapping.

== Diagnosis ==
There are no widely accepted diagnostic criteria for ACO. However, the diagnosis requires clinical features of both asthma and COPD. One diagnostic criteria, based on expert consensus, first described in 2016, requires the presence of three major and at least one minor criteria for the diagnosis of ACO. The major criteria are: a persistent airflow limitation (a ratio of forced expiratory volume in 1 second divided by forced vital capacity (FEV1/FVC) of less than 0.7 or below the lower limit of normal), a significant exposure history to tobacco smoke (defined as a greater than 10-pack/year history), or significant exposure to other indoor or outdoor air pollution, and a documented history of asthma or a significant improvement in FEV1 (of greater than 400mL) to an inhaled bronchodilator. The minor criteria include a history of atopy or allergic rhinitis, a more limited response to an inhaled bronchodilator (greater than 200 mL improvement in the FEV1 or a 12% improvement from baseline), and peripheral blood eosinophils greater than 300 cells/μL. Spirometry (documenting obstruction) is required for the diagnosis of ACO.

In those with asthma, some features often seen in COPD that may aid in the diagnosis of ACO include emphysema seen on imaging or a decreased diffusion capacity (DLCO) indicating significant lung tissue damage. In those with COPD, other features often seen in asthma that may aid in the diagnosis of ACO include an increase in the fraction of exhaled nitric oxide (FENO), a marker that is specific to the degree of airway inflammation in those with asthma, or increased levels of IgE (either total IgE or specific to inhaled antigens).

== Treatment ==
Treatment of ACO is based on expert opinion, as there are no universally accepted clinical guidelines. Treatment is usually based on whether clinical features of asthma or COPD predominate. Inhaled corticosteroids are the primary treatment in those with ACOS. Inhaled corticosteroids (ICS) should be continued in those with asthma who develop decreased airway responsiveness to bronchodilators consistent with ACO. Therapy can be escalated to include a long-acting beta-agonist (LABA) and inhaled steroid combination (ICS-LABA) or by adding on a long-acting anti-muscarinic inhaler (LAMA), known as triple therapy, in those with more severe or resistant disease.

Monoclonal antibodies targeting type 2 inflammation (which is predominant in asthma) have been used to treat severe asthma, and may also be used in severe cases of ACO. These monoclonal antibodies include omalizumab (an Anti-IgE antibody), mepolizumab (an anti-IL-5 antibody) and benralizumab (an anti-IL-5 receptor α antibody). People with ACOS and eosinophilia have a better response to ICS, with fewer exacerbations and hospitalizations seen in ACOS treated with long-term ICS. Systemic corticosteroids (intravenous or oral steroids) may be used during exacerbations of ACOS.

== Prognosis ==
The progression of permanent airflow obstruction (as measured by the rate of FEV1 decline) is slower in ACO as compared to COPD, but ACO with late-onset asthma is associated with a more rapid FEV1 decline (a more rapid progression of obstruction) and a worse prognosis. ACO with late-onset asthma is associated with a higher mortality as compared to COPD, asthma or healthy controls. Excluding ACO with late-onset asthma, ACO has better survival (lower mortality) than COPD, but higher mortality compared to asthma. In other studies, ACO was associated with worse dyspnea symptoms, more coughing, wheezing, and sputum production, as well as more frequent and more severe exacerbations as compared to COPD or asthma.

== Epidemiology ==
Due to heterogeneity of diagnostic criteria and a paucity of clinical trials, the prevalence of ACO is not well known. Based on a meta analysis, the prevalence of ACO in the general population is estimated to be 2%, whereas the prevalence of ACO in those with asthma is 26.5% and in those with COPD it is 29.6%.
