= Acute exacerbation of chronic obstructive pulmonary disease =

- Other names: Acute exacerbations of chronic bronchitis (AECB)
- Chest X-ray in a case of COPD exacerbation where a nasopharyngeal swab detected Haemophilus influenzae, with right-sided opacities
- Specialty: Respirology, emergency medicine

An acute exacerbation of chronic obstructive pulmonary disease (AECOPD), or acute exacerbations of chronic bronchitis (AECB), is a sudden worsening of chronic obstructive pulmonary disease (COPD) symptoms including shortness of breath, quantity and color of phlegm that typically lasts for several days.

It may be triggered by an infection with bacteria or viruses or by environmental pollutants. Typically, infections cause 75% or more of the exacerbations; bacteria can roughly be found in 25% of cases, viruses in another 25%, and both viruses and bacteria in another 25%. Airway inflammation is increased during the exacerbation resulting in increased hyperinflation, reduced expiratory air flow and decreased gas exchange.

Exacerbations can be classified as mild, moderate, and severe. As COPD progresses, exacerbations tend to become more frequent, the average being about three episodes per year.

== Signs and symptoms ==
An acute exacerbation of COPD is associated with increased frequency and severity of coughing. It is often accompanied by worsened chest congestion and discomfort. Shortness of breath and wheezing are present in many cases. Exacerbations may be accompanied by increased amount of cough and sputum productions, and a change in appearance of sputum. An abrupt worsening in COPD symptoms may cause rupture of the airways in the lungs, which in turn may cause a spontaneous pneumothorax.

In infection, there is often weakness, fever and chills. If due to a bacterial infection, the sputum may be slightly streaked with blood and coloured yellow or green.

== Causes ==
As the lungs tend to be vulnerable organs due to their exposure to harmful particles in the air, several things can cause an acute exacerbation of COPD:

- Respiratory infection, being responsible for approximately half of COPD exacerbations. Approximately half of these are due to viral infections and another half appears to be caused by bacterial infections. Common bacterial pathogens of acute exacerbations include Haemophilus influenzae, Streptococcus pneumoniae and Moraxella catarrhalis. Less common bacterial pathogens include Chlamydia pneumoniae and MRSA. Pathogens seen more frequently in patients with impaired lung function (FEV<35% of predicted) include Haemophilus parainfluenzae (after repeated use of antibiotics), Mycoplasma pneumoniae and gram-negative, opportunistic pathogens like Pseudomonas aeruginosa and Klebsiella pneumoniae.
- Allergens, e.g., pollens, wood or cigarette smoke, pollution
- Toxins, including a variety of different chemicals
- Air pollution
- Failing to follow a drug therapy program, e.g. improper use of an inhaler

In one-third of all COPD exacerbation cases, the cause cannot be identified.

== Diagnosis ==
The diagnostic criteria for acute exacerbation of COPD generally include a production of sputum that is purulent and may be thicker than usual, but without evidence of pneumonia (which involves mainly the alveoli rather than the bronchi). Also, diagnostic criteria may include an increase in frequency and severity of coughing, as well as increased shortness of breath.

A chest X-ray is usually performed on people with fever and, especially, hemoptysis (blood in the sputum), to rule out pneumonia and get information on the severity of the exacerbation. Hemoptysis may also indicate other, potentially fatal, medical conditions.

A history of exposure to potential causes and evaluation of symptoms may help in revealing the cause the exacerbation, which helps in choosing the best treatment. A sputum culture can specify which strain is causing a bacterial AECB. An early morning sample is preferred.

E-nose showed the ability to smell the cause of the exacerbation.

The definition of a COPD exacerbation is commonly described as "lost in translation", meaning that there is no universally accepted standard with regard to defining an acute exacerbation of COPD. Many organizations consider it a priority to create such a standard, as it would be a major step forward in the diagnosis and quality of treatment of COPD.

== Prevention ==
Acute exacerbations can be partially prevented. Some infections can be prevented by vaccination against pathogens such as influenza and Streptococcus pneumoniae. Regular medication use can prevent some COPD exacerbations; long acting beta-adrenoceptor agonists (LABAs), long-acting anticholinergics, inhaled corticosteroids and low-dose theophylline have all been shown to reduce the frequency of COPD exacerbations. Other methods of prevention include:

- Smoking cessation and avoiding dust, passive smoking, and other inhaled irritants
- Yearly influenza and 5-year pneumococcal vaccinations
- Regular exercise, appropriate rest, and healthy nutrition
- Avoiding people currently infected with e.g. cold and influenza
- Maintaining good fluid intake and humidifying the home, in order to help reduce the formation of thick sputum and chest congestion.

== Treatment ==
Based on the severity different treatments may be used. Mild exacerbations are treated with short acting bronchodilators (SABDs). Moderate exacerbations are treated with SABDs together with antibiotics or oral corticosteroids, or both. Severe exacerbations need hospital treatment, and the prognosis is poor.

=== Oxygen ===
Oxygen therapy should be initiated if there is significantly low blood oxygen. High flow oxygen may be harmful in those with an acute exacerbation of COPD. In the prehospital environment those given high flow O_{2} rather than titrating their O_{2} saturations to 88% to 92% had worse outcomes. In specific circumstances high flow oxygen however can be beneficial. Antibiotics and steroids appear useful in mild to severe disease.

=== Medications ===
- Inhaled bronchodilators open up the airways in the lungs. These include salbutamol and terbutaline (both β_{2}-adrenergic agonists), and ipratropium (an anticholinergic). Medication can be administered via inhaler or nebuliser. There is no evidence to prefer a nebuliser over an inhaler.
- Antibiotics are used if a bacterial infection is the suspected cause. However, antibiotics will not treat exacerbations caused by viruses. Viral infections will usually be cured with time with the aid of proper rest and care. Still, other medications may be needed to control symptoms. Lipid-soluble antibiotics such as macrolides, tetracyclines, and fluoroquinolones penetrate the lung tissue well. Macrolides are more active against Streptococcus pneumoniae than the tetracyclines and the older fluoroquinolones. Within the macrolides, newer ones are more active against Haemophilus influenzae than the older erythromycin. Regimens should generally be given for five days. Choice of antibiotics is also dependent on the severity of the symptoms:
  - "Simple" COPD is generally where a person 65 years or less, has fewer than four exacerbations per year, has minimal or moderate impairment in respiratory function and no comorbid disease. In patients with "simple" COPD, therapy should be targeted towards Haemophilus influenzae, Moraxella catarrhalis, Streptococcus pneumoniae, and possibly pathogens of atypical pneumonia. The first-line treatment is a beta-lactam antibiotic such as amoxicillin. The choice will depend on resistance patterns. In patients with penicillin allergy, doxycycline or trimethoprim are preferred.
  - More complicated bronchitis may be when the patient is more than 65 years old, has four or more exacerbations per year, has an FEV1/FVC ratio of less than 50% on spirometry, has failed to respond to previous antibiotic treatment, and/or has comorbidity. In these cases, treatment should be aimed at Gram-negative bacteria and the possibility of high antibiotic resistance should be considered. Sputum culture results are of great value in determining antibiotic resistance. First-line treatment is cefuroxime or co-amoxiclav. Third-line treatment, as well as treatment in penicillin-allergic patients, is a fluoroquinolone such as ciprofloxacin. An agent active against Streptococcus pneumoniae may have to be added.
- Corticosteroids such as prednisolone reduce inflammation in the airways. According to a 2018 systematic review, a shorter, five-day course of systemic corticosteroids is likely comparable to longer (10–14 day) therapy for treatment of COPD exacerbation (Odds ratio (OR) 0.72, 95% confidence interval (CI) 0.36 to 1.46).
- Theophylline is generally not recommended.

There should also be a "care plan" in case of future exacerbations. Patients may watch for symptoms, such as shortness of breath, change in character or amount of mucus, and start self-treatment as discussed with a health care provider. This allows for treatment right away until a doctor can be seen.

The symptoms of acute exacerbations are treated using short-acting bronchodilators. A course of corticosteroids, usually in tablet or intravenous rather than inhaled form, can speed up recovery. The IV and oral forms of steroids have been found to be equivalent. Antibiotics are often used but will only help if the exacerbation is due to an infection. Antibiotics are indicated when a patient notes increased sputum production, purulent sputum, increased dyspnea, has an elevated white count, or is febrile. Examples of first-line antibiotics are amoxicillin, doxycycline, and co-trimoxazole.

=== Mechanical ventilation ===
Severe exacerbations can require hospital care where treatments such as oxygen and mechanical ventilation may be required. Mechanical ventilation can be invasive (endotracheal intubation) or non-invasive forms of ventilation such as continuous positive airway pressure (CPAP) or bilevel positive airway pressure (BiPAP).

== Epidemiology ==
The incidence varies depending on which definition is used, but definitions by Anthonisen et al. the typical COPD patient averages two to three AECB episodes per year. With a COPD prevalence of more than 12 million (possibly 24 million including undiagnosed ones) in the United States, there are at least 30 million incidences of AECB annually in the US.
