= Chronic obstructive pulmonary disease =

Lung disease involving long-term poor airflow

- Other names: Chronic obstructive lung disease (COLD), chronic obstructive airway disease (COAD)
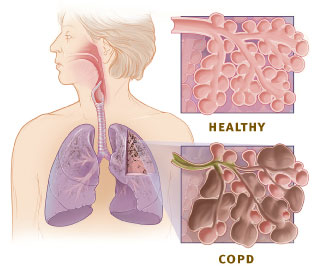
- Section of a lung showing centrilobular emphysema, with enlarged airspaces in the centre of a lobule usually caused by smoking and a major feature of COPD
- Specialty: Pulmonology
- Symptoms: Shortness of breath, chronic cough, sputum production
- Complications: Anxiety, depression, pulmonary heart disease, pneumothorax
- Usual onset: Over 35 years old
- Duration: Long term
- Causes: Tobacco smoking, air pollution, genetics
- Diagnostic method: Spirometry
- Differential diagnosis: Asthma, congestive heart failure, bronchiectasis, tuberculosis, obliterative bronchiolitis, diffuse panbronchiolitis
- Prevention: Stopping smoking, improving indoor and outdoor air quality, tobacco control measures, occupational safety
- Treatment: Pulmonary rehabilitation, long-term oxygen therapy, lung volume reduction,
- Medication: Inhaled bronchodilators and steroids
- Frequency: 213 million (2021); 2.7% of global population
- Deaths: 3.65 million (2021); 5% of global deaths

Chronic obstructive pulmonary disease (COPD) is a long-term lung condition that makes it progressively harder to breathe. It occurs when the airways and lung tissue become damaged, leading to reduced airflow and reduced efficiency of oxygen exchange in the lungs. COPD develops gradually over time, and while it cannot currently be cured, treatments and lifestyle changes can help control symptoms and slow disease progression. Early diagnosis and prompt treatment are recommended.

The condition includes two related lung problems: chronic bronchitis and emphysema. Chronic bronchitis involves ongoing inflammation of the airways, causing excess mucus production, coughing, and chest discomfort. Emphysema involves damage to the small air sacs in the lungs, which reduces the lungs' ability to transfer oxygen into the bloodstream. Many people with COPD experience shortness of breath, persistent cough, wheezing, and reduced exercise tolerance. Symptoms can become more severe during acute flare-ups, which can be triggered by viral and bacterial infections and exposure to irritants. People with COPD generally display a combination of these symptoms, and are likely to have additional health issues.

COPD can develop due to multiple factors, most often involving long-term exposure to lung irritants. The strongest risk factors are tobacco smoke, air pollution, and workplace dust and chemical fumes. Smoke from fuels used for cooking and heating is a primary risk factor in some places, particularly for women and young children. Factors affecting lung development in early life such as respiratory infections, poor nutrition, and physical inactivity, can increase risk of COPD in later life. Genetics can also play a role.

The diagnosis of COPD is usually confirmed using lung function tests that measure how well air moves in and out of the lungs. While COPD cannot currently be cured, treatment can significantly improve quality of life. Common treatments include inhaled medications that help open the airways, pulmonary rehabilitation programmes that improve fitness and breathing control, and oxygen therapy for people with advanced disease. Quitting smoking is strongly recommended, as is reducing exposure to other lung irritants.

As of 2021, COPD affected about 213 million people worldwide. COPD typically occurs in people over the age of 35–40, and risk increases with age. In 2021, COPD was the fourth-biggest cause of death, responsible for approximately 5% of total deaths. Almost 90% of COPD deaths in those under 70 years of age occur in low and middle income countries. The number of deaths is projected to increase further because of continued exposure to risk factors and an ageing population.

== Signs and symptoms ==
Signs and symptoms of stages of COPD

Wheezing
The sound of wheezing as heard with a stethoscope.

The Global Initiative for Chronic Obstructive Lung Disease (GOLD) defines COPD as a lung condition with multiple underlying causes, characterized by long-lasting respiratory symptoms (shortness of breath, cough, and mucus) which can flare up intermittently. Symptoms are due to impairments of the airways (bronchitis, bronchiolitis) or small air sacs of the lungs (emphysema) that cause persistent, often progressive, airflow obstruction.

=== Shortness of breath ===
A cardinal symptom of COPD is chronic and progressive shortness of breath. Breathlessness is often the most distressing symptom, causing anxiety and the level of disability that is experienced. Symptoms of wheezing and chest tightness associated with breathlessness can vary over the course of a day or between days and are not always present. Chest tightness often follows exertion.

People experiencing distress may naturally adopt a sitting posture, leaning forward with their hands on their knees, known as the tripod position. This can help to decrease breathlessness by stabilizing and lifting the shoulder girdle. People with more advanced COPD may also breathe through pursed lips, which can improve shortness of breath.

Shortness of breath often results in reduced physical activity, and low physical activity levels are associated with worse outcomes. People with COPD often have increased breathlessness and frequent colds before seeking treatment. In severe and very severe cases, there may be constant tiredness, weight loss, muscle loss, and anorexia.

=== Cough ===
The first symptom of COPD to appear is usually a chronic cough, which may or may not bring up thick slippery fluid (referred to as sputum, mucus or phlegm). Coughing up mucus can be intermittent and may be difficult to evaluate. A productive cough that brings up mucus is seen in less than 30% of cases. Sometimes, limited airflow may develop without a cough. Symptoms are usually worse in the morning. Depending on social or cultural factors, mucus may be swallowed or spat out.

A chronic productive cough may result from the release of too much mucus within the airways. When it persists for more than three months each year for at least two years, it is called chronic bronchitis. Chronic bronchitis can occur before the restricted airflow diagnostic of COPD. People tend to under-report symptoms, and may assume that symptoms result from short-term irritation rather than underlying changes in lung function. In severe COPD, vigorous coughing may lead to rib fractures or to a brief loss of consciousness.

=== Exacerbations ===
An acute exacerbation is a sudden flare-up or worsening of signs and symptoms that lasts from several days to two weeks. Worsening of symptoms can involve increased breathlessness, an increase in mucus volume, a change in mucus character, or a change in cough or wheeze. A commonly found sign is air trapping, difficulty in breathing out fully.

Flare-ups are often associated with inflammation resulting from viral or bacterial infection or environmental irritation of the airways. Viral infections such as the common cold account for 70% of flare-ups. Colds more often occur during the winter months, but can occur at any time. Bacterial respiratory infections are the second most frequent triggers, including Haemophilus influenzae, Pseudomonas aeruginosa and Streptococcus pneumoniae. Bacterial infections may occur in combination or be secondary to viral infections.

Environmental insults that can trigger acute flare-ups include exposure to smoking, use of solid fuels, and other sources of indoor or outdoor air pollution. Exposure to tobacco smoke can be either active or passive. Smoke from wildfires is an increasing risk in many parts of the world due to climate change. The United States Environmental Protection Agency recommends the use of well-fitting particulate masks, which give more effective protection than dust masks when dealing with the fine particles from wildfires. This same advice is offered by governments in Canada and Australia regarding forest fires.

The risk of developing a COPD flare-up is higher in women; in people with one or more flare-ups in the last year; in those with more severe COPD as measured by lung function tests; and in those with chronic bronchitis or related conditions such as gastroesophageal reflux, pulmonary hypertension or pulmonary embolism. People with two or more flare-ups a year are associated with worse disease progression and are classed as frequent exacerbators. More flare-ups are associated with more rapid decline in lung function, lower quality of life, and higher morbidity and mortality. Frailty in ageing is linked to more flare-ups and hospitalizations.

== Other conditions ==
COPD often occurs along with multiple other conditions (comorbidities) affecting the body's systems. This reflects both shared risk factors and the role of inflammation in illness. Compared to people of the same age without COPD, people with COPD have higher rates of cardiovascular disease, respiratory conditions (lung cancer, pneumonia and asthma), musculoskeletal conditions (osteoporosis), neuropsychiatric conditions (depression, dementia, anxiety), and metabolic disorders (diabetes mellitus, metabolic syndrome, chronic kidney disease, and skeletal muscle dysfunction). Cognitive impairment is common in those with COPD, as it is for other lung conditions that affect airflow. Cognitive impairment is associated with the declining ability to cope with the basic activities of daily living.

People with COPD have up to 83% higher risk of pneumonia, atrial fibrillation, and heart failure, and 78% higher risk of depression. Metabolic syndrome has been seen to affect up to 50% percent of those with COPD and significantly affects the outcomes. When metabolic syndrome occurs with COPD, there is more systemic inflammation. Metabolic syndrome on its own has a high rate of morbidity and mortality, and this rate is amplified when it occurs with COPD.

There is also an associated risk of developing pulmonary hypertension, which leads to worse outcomes, including the risk of death. The likelihood that pulmonary hypertension will complicate COPD has been reported as 39%. Of the people with COPD listed for lung transplantation, 82% were documented as having pulmonary hypertension.

Other complications include reduced quality of life and increased disability, cor pulmonale, chest infections, secondary polycythemia, respiratory failure, pneumothorax, and cachexia (muscle wasting). Tuberculosis is a risk factor for the development of COPD, and is also a potential comorbidity.

In cases of COVID-19, COPD patients were at higher risk for severe complications, including hospitalization, intensive care unit admission, and mortality. They were also likely to exhibit symptoms of long COVID involving persistent respiratory symptoms, fatigue, and cognitive dysfunction. Differentiating COVID-19 symptoms from an exacerbation is difficult; when symptoms include loss of taste or smell, COVID-19 should be suspected.

People with COPD have more health issues than those without COPD. Multimorbidity is associated with a worse COPD prognosis. People with COPD are more likely to die of respiratory or heart-related causes than those without COPD, and to die at younger ages. People with COPD often die as a result of comorbidities rather than from respiratory problems.

== Categorization ==
Categorizing COPD in terms of subtypes can support more targeted treatment approaches for patients. A phenotype refers to a collection of observable characteristics, including symptoms, frequency of episodes, and other details of patient history that are used in clinical practice. An endotype links such observable traits to underlying mechanisms. One phenotype may be related to multiple endotypes. A genotype is based on the presence or absence of a genetic factor and its effects on underlying mechanisms. An etiotype is a grouping based on contributory causes. Individuals can be affected by multiple causes. Specific causes may be related to particular phenotypes.

=== Emphysema and chronic bronchitis phenotypes ===
Historically, phenotypic definitions of COPD have often focused on symptoms of emphysema and chronic bronchitis. Emphysema involves enlarged air sacs in the lungs (alveoli) whose walls break down resulting in permanent damage to the lung tissue. Emphysema can exist without airflow limitation, but it commonly involves it. Other structural abnormalities can also limit airflow. Chronic bronchitis is defined as a productive cough that is present for at least three months each year for two years. It does not always result in airflow limitation, although the risk of developing COPD is great.

Early categorizations grouped patients as type A and type B based on physical symptoms. Type A (emphysema types) were known as pink puffers due to their pink complexion, fast breathing rate, and pursed lips. Type B (chronic bronchitic types) were referred to as blue bloaters due to low oxygen levels causing a bluish color to the skin and lips and swollen ankles. Recently, it has been suggested that these early phenotypes may reflect unique underlying mechanisms: an "emphysematous phenotype" that involves destruction of air sacs (alveoli) and a "chronic bronchitis phenotype" associated with airway inflammation. Most people with COPD have a combination of symptoms reflecting both emphysema and airway disease.

=== Other phenotypes ===
COPD is complex and is increasingly recognized as a diverse group of disorders with differing risk factors and clinical courses. This has resulted in other subtypes or phenotypes of COPD being proposed. A common phenotype is the frequent exacerbator, someone who has had two or more flare-ups within a year. Frequent exacerbators have a poor prognosis, so identifying them and preventing further flare-ups is a major concern.

Asthma-COPD overlap (ACO phenotype), a condition with clinical features of both asthma and COPD, is another proposed subtype of COPD. It is considered by some to be a separate medical condition. A pulmonary vascular COPD phenotype has been described involving cardiovascular dysfunction. A molecular phenotype of CFTR dysfunction is shared with cystic fibrosis. A combined phenotype of chronic bronchitis and bronchiectasis has been described, with a difficulty noted in determining the best treatment. The identification and recognition of different phenotypes can guide appropriate treatment approaches.

=== Genotypes ===
The alpha-1 antitrypsin deficiency (AATD) genetic subtype involves a rare mutation in the SERPINA1 gene, which is linked to proteinase-antiprotease imbalance. In this genotype, unchecked activity of elastase in white blood cells, called neutrophils leads to early-onset emphysema. A treatment for this type of COPD has been proposed, involving intravenous administration of purified AAT protein.

=== Endotypes ===
An endotype is defined in terms of a biological or molecular mechanism that explains why a given patient has specific observable disease features. Two well-defined COPD endotypes are related to inflammation mechanisms of white blood cells in the immune system. The types of white blood cells involved are neutrophils and eosinophils.

Neutrophils are a type of white blood cell that deals with injury and infection. Environmental stressors (e.g., cigarette smoke, air pollution) induce neutrophil-associated inflammation in airways, resulting in the release of interleukin (IL)−1, IL-8, Th17, and other chemical messengers. This is called the neutrophil-centric inflammasome pathway, or "T2-low" COPD. Patients have elevated levels of IL-17 and other neutrophil proteins. Their symptoms align with the classical smoking-associated chronic bronchitis phenotype. This endotype is associated with accelerated decline in lung function and recurrent infectious flare-ups.

Eosinophils are white blood cells involved in allergies and asthma. The mechanisms involved are similar to those in allergen response and asthma. In a pathway known as IgE-independent mast cell activation, mast cells release inflammatory chemical messengers (histamine and tryptase), stimulating Type 2 helper cells to produce cytokines (IL-4, IL-5, and IL-13). This drives eosinophil-induced inflammation and mucus production. This is called eosinophil-dependent type 2 immunity or "T2-high" COPD. 20–40% of COPD patients display activation of type 2 immune pathways with elevated eosinophil counts in blood or sputum. They have "asthma-like" symptoms and a higher risk of flare-ups and hospitalization. The "T2-high" endotype may overlap with the ACO phenotype.

=== Etiotypes ===
In 2023, the Global Initiative for Chronic Obstructive Lung Disease (GOLD) recognized the variety of causes contributing to COPD by introducing a new classification system to categorize COPD by underlying causes and risk factors, or etiotypes. The 2023 GOLD report identifies seven distinct etiotypes:

- cigarette smoking COPD (COPD-C)
- biomass and pollution exposure COPD (COPD-P)
- genetically determined COPD (COPD-G)
- COPD due to abnormal lung development (COPD-D)
- COPD with asthma (COPD-A)
- COPD due to infections (COPD-I)
- COPD of unknown cause (COPD-U)

This framework better reflects variation in COPD causes and disease progression in global populations. In low-and middle-income countries, COPD related to the burning of organic materials as fuels (COPD-P) and to repeated childhood respiratory infections (COPD-I) are more common.

Identification of causes has implications for disease management. Some etiotypes can be related to specific clinical phenotypes. For example, biomass and pollution-associated COPD (COPD-P) tends to involve greater tissue damage to small airways and airflow obstruction. Tobacco-related disease (COPD-C) involves more damage to air sacs and reduces oxygen transfer to the bloodstream. Identification of such differences emphasizes the need to address underlying issues. Health programs to improve early-life lung development can be part of COPD prevention and management. Providing clean-energy cooking fuels reduces exposure to biomass. Vaccination can help to prevent respiratory infections such as influenza, pneumococcus, and RSV, and reduce dangerous COPD flare-ups.

== Causes ==
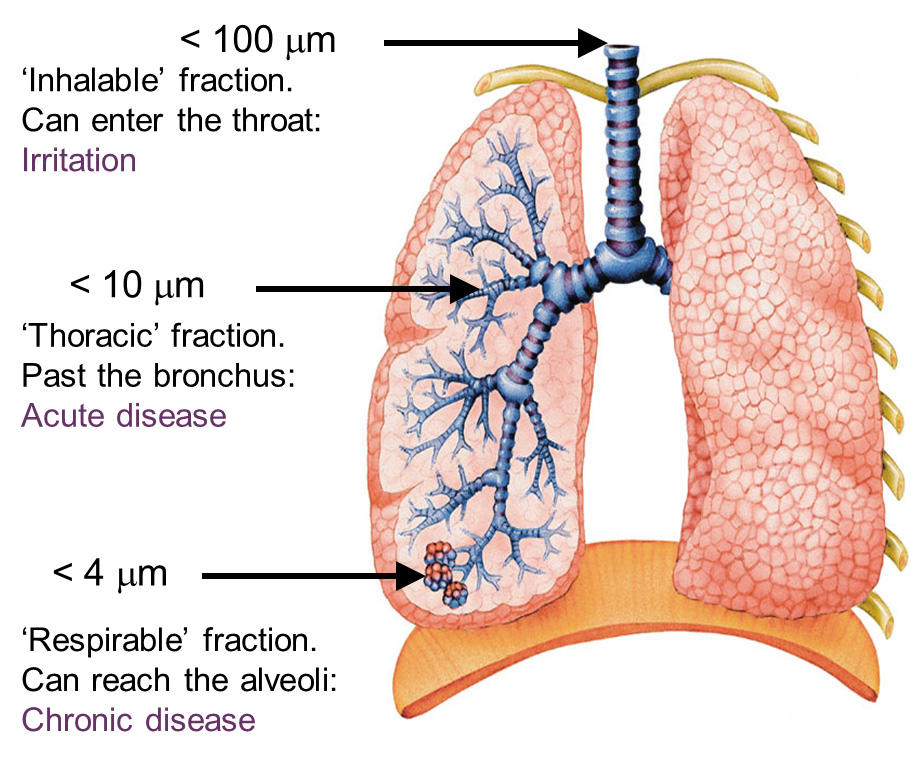
Penetration of airborne irritants into the lungs depends on the size of irritants and airways

COPD tends to develop as a result of exposure to harmful particles or gases, including tobacco smoke, that irritate the lungs. This causes significant or long-term inflammation that interacts with individual host factors. The greatest risk factor for the development of COPD is tobacco smoke, accounting for up to 70% of cases in first-world countries. Exposure can be either active (smoking yourself) or passive (living in a house where someone else smokes).

Up to 30% of COPD cases occur in people who have never smoked, and many heavy smokers do not develop COPD, so other factors also need to be considered. These include exposure to indoor and outdoor pollutants, particulate matter, allergens, occupational exposure, and host factors. In developing countries, poorly ventilated cooking and heating fires are a common cause of COPD, particularly for women and young children. COPD is also caused by exposure to occupational irritants such as dust from farming (e.g. grains), manufacturing (e.g. cadmium dust or fumes), mining, and construction. The three main types of construction dust are silica dust, non-silica dust (e.g., dust from gypsum, cement, limestone, marble, and dolomite), and wood dust.

Host factors include genetic susceptibility. Alpha-1 antitrypsin deficiency (A1AD) is an important genetic risk factor for COPD. It is advised that everybody with COPD be screened for A1AD.

Other host factors are associated with poverty, physical inactivity and ageing. The role of changes in lung function throughout life is increasingly being recognized in COPD. Early-life factors can contribute to abnormal lung development and increase the risk of COPD in later life. Many early-life risk factors could be prevented, such as poor nutrition, low physical activity, early alcohol consumption, and exposure to smoking and biomass fumes. Another host factor that can arise during development is airway branching variation. In Europe, airway hyperresponsiveness is rated as the second most important risk factor after smoking. It can contribute to asthma, which is recognized as an additional risk factor.

Alcohol abuse can lead to alcoholic lung disease and is seen to be an independent risk factor for COPD. Mucociliary clearance is disrupted by chronic exposure to alcohol; macrophage activity is diminished and an inflammatory response promoted. The damage leads to a susceptibility for infection, which is increased when combined with smoking. Smoking induces the upregulation of the expression of ACE2, a receptor for the SARS-CoV-2 virus.

=== Smoking ===
The greatest risk factor for the development of COPD globally is tobacco smoking. Exposure can be either active (smoking yourself) or passive (living in a house where someone else smokes). The second most frequent substance that is smoked is marijuana. Although marijuana smoking carries a lower risk for COPD than tobacco smoking, chronic marijuana smoking is still associated with increased respiratory symptoms similar to those of chronic bronchitis. The highest level of risk is associated with smoking both marijuana and tobacco. This carries a higher symptom burden and greater risk of developing COPD compared to smoking tobacco only or to marijuana only. Vaping is also associated with an increased risk of COPD.

==== Tobacco ====
Smokers and ex-smokers have a higher rate of developing COPD. In high-income countries, smoking is associated with over 70% of COPD cases, while in low and middle income countries, it accounts for 30% to 40% of cases. In the United States and United Kingdom, of those with COPD, 80–95% are either current or previous smokers. About 20% of those who smoke will develop COPD, and about 50% of heavy smokers will get COPD.

Several studies indicate that women are more susceptible than men to the harmful effects of tobacco smoke. Given the same amount of cigarette smoking, women have a higher risk of COPD than men. Women who smoke during pregnancy, and during the early life of their child, also increase risk of their child's later development of COPD. Epigenetic studies support this link, showing that ACSF3 is differentially methylated in smoke-exposed fetal lungs, and an integrative study identified it as a key regulator of COPD.

Inhaled smoke triggers the excessive release of proteases. This degrades elastin, the major component of the walls of alveoli, the small air sacs in the lungs. Damage to the cell walls interferes with their ability to transfer oxygen from the lungs to the bloodstream. Smoke also interferes with cilia, limiting their ability to clear mucus, cellular debris and unwanted fluid from airways in the respiratory tract.

Other methods of inhaling tobacco smoke, such as cigar, pipe, water-pipe, and hookah use, also confer a risk. Water-pipe or hookah smoke appears to be as harmful or even more harmful than smoking cigarettes.

==== Marijuana ====
Marijuana is the second most commonly smoked substance. Both cannabis and tobacco smoke contain toxic and carcinogenic compounds such as polycyclic aromatic hydrocarbons (PAHs), volatile organic compounds (VOCs), and reactive oxygen species (ROS). These cause DNA, cell, and tissue damage through mechanisms of oxidative stress and chronic inflammation, which are involved in COPD. However, there are differences in the effects of marijuana and tobacco use.

Tobacco smoke has a bronchoconstrictive effect that tightens smooth muscle in the lungs, contributing to coughing, wheezing, and tightness in the chest. In contrast, marijuana use has a bronchodilatory effect that can temporarily counteract airflow obstruction. At lower levels (a few joints per month), cannabis smoking may not cause the type of structural damage in small airways that occurs in tobacco smoking, which leads to airflow limitation and severe shortness of breath.

In contrast, heavier and prolonged cannabis use (>20 uses per month) leads to chronic inflammation and impaired function in large airways, likely due to the effects of PAHs and VOCs. Chronic cannabis use is associated with increased respiratory symptoms similar to those in chronic bronchitis, including cough, mucus production, and wheezing. One study reported that the damaging effects on large airway function of a single cannabis joint were comparable to 2.5 to 5 tobacco cigarettes. Also, marijuana smokers typically reported the onset of respiratory symptoms ten years earlier than tobacco smokers. There is evidence that some cannabis-related respiratory symptoms appear to resolve if users stop smoking, whereas tobacco smokers continue to decline despite stopping.

==== Combined tobacco and marijuana use ====
However, when someone smokes both marijuana and tobacco, either in combination or separately, their risk increases more highly, a synergistic effect. Those who smoke both tobacco and cannabis show a higher symptom burden and COPD risk than those who smoke only tobacco (known to affect both large and small airways) or only marijuana (known to affect large airway function). The increase in risk was particularly noticeable at high levels of cumulative cannabis exposure (>50 joints lifetime). Using both marijuana and tobacco appears to have a cumulative toxic effect. It may increase risk for conditions such as bullous emphysema, spontaneous pneumothorax, and lung cancer.

=== Pollution ===
Access to clean fuel and clean cooking facilities as of 2023

Air pollution is a major cause of COPD, contributing an estimated 50% of the total attributable risk of COPD worldwide. It is the leading known risk factor for COPD in lifelong nonsmokers, and has no safe threshold. Air can contain a mix of potentially harmful suspended particles and chemicals such as carbon monoxide, heavy metals, lead, ozone, nitrogen oxides (NOx), sulfur oxides, polycyclic aromatic hydrocarbons, benzene and acrolein. Both particulate matter and gases in air pollution contribute to COPD pathophysiology.

The harmfulness of particulate matter depends on the size, structure, and composition of the particles involved. Particulate matter can carry toxic metals and organic matter and transport them through the lower and upper respiratory tracts deep into the lungs. Exposure to particulates can contribute to the development of COPD and trigger flare-ups either directly through irritation or indirectly due to infections.

Air pollution is often described in terms of ambient (outdoor) and household (indoor) air pollutants. Major sources of ambient air pollution include suspended dusts, combustion of fossil fuels and biofuels, industrial emissions, waste disposal, and wildfire smoke. Combustion releases fine and ultrafine particulates, greenhouse gases and other pollutants. Photochemical reactions between sunlight, nitrogen oxides (NOx) and volatile organic compounds (VOCs) produce ozone, which increases the risk of death from COPD. Black carbon or soot is an air pollutant associated with an increased risk of hospitalization from flare-ups. Long-term exposure brings with it an increased rate of mortality.

The main indoor air pollutants include particulate matter, VOCs, nitrogen oxides, sulfur dioxide, carbon monoxide, ozone, radon, toxic metals, and microorganisms. Smoking is a major contributor to indoor air pollution, as is the burning of wood and other biomass fuels for heating and cooking. Building materials and furnishings can be sources of formaldehyde, asbestos, and lead dust. Chemicals in cleaning products, paints, varnishes, pesticides, fragrances, air fresheners, and office equipment can release VOCs and aerosols. Microorganisms include mold, fungi, bacteria, and dust mites. Workplace-related exposures in occupations such as farming, cleaning and industrial work include dust from grinding, blasting, and sanding, grain dust, cleaning solutions and pesticides. Radon gas occurs naturally and can enter buildings through cracks in foundations and walls. Pollutants from outdoor air can also enter buildings.

Comparisons of COPD rates between cities and rural areas can vary widely and tend to reflect underlying factors such as gender, smoking (rural people may smoke more), work-related pollutant exposure (grain dust and pesticides in rural areas, manufacturing in cities), and accessibility to health care.

Areas with poor outdoor air quality, including that from exhaust gas, generally have higher rates of COPD. 97% of the major cities in the world fail to meet the World Health Organization (WHO)'s safety standards for particulate matter in ambient air. Urban air pollution significantly affects the developing lung and its maturation, and is a potential risk factor for the later development of COPD.

Patients with COPD in rural areas experience greater morbidity and obstacles to care than those in urban areas. Racial/ethnic minorities and those with low incomes, particularly in rural areas, are also at greater risk of forgoing doctor visits due to cost.

Measures to prevent and control air pollution and reduce emissions have been taken by some governments, and have significantly reduced both pollution and COPD incidence. When outdoor pollution levels are high, people can reduce risk by wearing personal protective equipment such as an N95 mask, and by reducing the time and intensity of outdoor activities. Quitting smoking, using clean fuels for heating and cooking, and improving ventilation are important steps for improving indoor air quality and reducing COPD risk.

==== Biomass fuels ====
Between 2 and 3 billion people (most of whom are in low-income countries) cook, heat, or light their homes using solid biomass fuels such as wood, crop wastes, charcoal, or dry dung. Poorly ventilated open fires and simple stoves used for cooking and heating often use biomass fuels, kerosene, or coal, generating very high levels of indoor air pollution. Globally, 50% of all households and 90% of rural households are estimated to use such fuels. They are the main source of energy in 80% of homes in India, China and sub-Saharan Africa. Wood is also used for household heating in developed countries (e.g., Canada, Australia, USA), but there, use tends to be seasonal and involve lower exposure levels.

Use of biomass fuels increases indoor air pollution and is one of the most common causes of COPD in developing countries. Women tend to do the cooking and other tasks. This increases women's exposure to indoor pollutants and the extent to which they are affected. Small children who tend to be at home, and whose lungs are still developing, are also likely to be more affected. Exposure to indoor biomass smoke has been associated with acute lower respiratory infections in children younger than five, and with COPD in men and women aged 30 or more. The overall risk of COPD for indoor biomass exposure was estimated at 3.2 for women and 1.8 for men.

Improving cookstoves and kitchen ventilation, and using clean fuels for heating and cooking, are important steps for reducing indoor COPD risk. Switching from biomass fuel to biogas for cooking has been shown to reduce the risk of developing COPD. Improving conditions for longer periods more effectively countered the decline in lung function.

==== Occupational exposure ====
Exposure to workplace dusts, chemicals and fumes in a wide variety of industries increases the risk of COPD in smokers, nonsmokers and never-smokers. In the United States, workplace exposure is estimated to be the cause of COPD in 31.1% of cases in never-smokers and 19.2% of all cases. Workplace exposure likely represents a greater risk in countries with insufficient regulations. In China, the highest occupational risks were associated with agriculture (farming, forestry, animal husbandry, and fishery), followed by manufacturing and mining. Exposure level (low, medium, or high) correlated with the severity of COPD.

Substances implicated in occupational exposure include organic dusts (e.g. dusts from grains, flour, paper- and textile-making), inorganic dusts (e.g. cadmium, silica, coal dust, asbestos, cement), fumes from cadmium and welding, and irritant gases used in industrial production and in cleaning (e.g. nitrous fumes, sulphur dioxide and chlorine).

The negative effects of occupational exposure and smoking are interrelated, and the two factors may be additive or synergistically reinforce each other. Symptoms differ. Compared to smokers with COPD, never-smoking patients with COPD are more likely to have symptoms of asthma and bronchiectasis, and a history of pulmonary tuberculosis, and less likely to have symptoms of emphysema.

Occupational exposures may be underdiagnosed, particularly in never-smokers. Taking a detailed occupational history and identifying possible occupational causes is important for the intervention and management of COPD. Exposure to dusts and gases in the workplace is potentially reducible through regulation, education and training, and increased use of safety measures and protective equipment.

=== Genetics ===
Genetics plays a role in the development of COPD. COPD is more common among relatives of those with COPD who smoke than among unrelated smokers. The most well known genetic risk factor is alpha-1 antitrypsin deficiency (AATD) and this is the only genotype (genetic subtype) with a specific treatment. This risk is particularly high if someone deficient in alpha-1 antitrypsin (AAT) also smokes. It is responsible for about 1–5% of cases and the condition is present in about three to four in 10,000 people.

Mutations in MMP1 gene that encodes for interstitial collagenase are associated with COPD.

The COPDGene study is an ongoing longitudinal study investigating the epidemiology of COPD, identifying phenotypes, and looking for their likely association with susceptible genes. Genome-wide analyses in concert with the International COPD Genetics Consortium has identified more than 80 genome regions associated with COPD. Whole genome sequencing is an ongoing collaboration (2019) with the National Heart, Lung and Blood Institute (NHLBI) to identify rare genetic determinants.

=== Abnormal lung development ===
The role of lung function throughout life is increasingly being recognized. It has been suggested that having smaller airways relative to lung size is a possible indicator of whether someone is likely to develop COPD. Mechanisms such as abnormal lung development and accelerated lung function decline, beginning early in life, can lead to COPD in late adulthood. Some early-life factors that contribute to poor lung development may be preventable, such as poor nutrition, low physical activity, early alcohol consumption, and exposure to smoking.

A host factor of an airway branching variation, arising during development, has been described. A branch variant in the central airway is specifically associated with an increased susceptibility for the later development of COPD. A genetic association for the variants with FGF10 has been suggested.

In Europe, airway hyperresponsiveness (AHR) is rated as the second most important risk factor after smoking. In AHR, airway smooth muscle becomes more sensitive. It is more likely to tighten in response to stimuli in the environment (direct AHR), or chemical messengers released by mast cells (indirect AHR). This drives eosinophilic and type 2 helper T lymphocyte-driven airway inflammation. It may lead to airway structural changes known as remodeling and airflow obstruction. In those with asthma, AHR can contribute to breathlessness, wheeze, and chest tightness. AHR may be a treatable trait.

=== Asthma ===
A history of asthma in childhood is associated with decreases in adult lung function and higher susceptibility to COPD. Asthma is a recognized risk factor: the comorbidity of COPD is reported to be 12 times higher in patients with asthma after adjusting for smoking history. Asthma commonly starts in childhood, with variable symptoms of breathlessness, chest tightness, cough, and wheeze. The onset of symptoms may relate to times of day and identifiable triggers such as dust, pollen, and grass. In contrast, COPD has a later onset and is progressive; airflow limitation in COPD is poorly reversible; and respiratory symptoms in COPD are persistent.

Asthma predominantly involves eosinophilic and type 2 helper T lymphocyte-driven airway inflammation. It has been suggested that a diagnosis of asthma in childhood may be associated with poor lung function in adulthood. The occurrence of both asthma and COPD, referred to as Asthma-COPD overlap (ACO), is associated with increased severity of respiratory symptoms, increased hospital admission, and worse quality of life, compared to either asthma or COPD alone Asthma patients who have been exposed to higher levels of air pollution are observed to be almost three times more likely to develop ACO. Higher incidence of ACO is related to specific industries and occupations, indicating the importance of workplace exposures on respiratory health.

=== Infections ===
A history of respiratory infections in childhood is associated with decreases in adult lung function and higher susceptibility to COPD. Both tuberculosis and pneumonia in childhood are risk factors for COPD, with adult COPD patients experiencing worse symptoms and poorer lung function as measured by spirometry.

== Pathophysiology ==
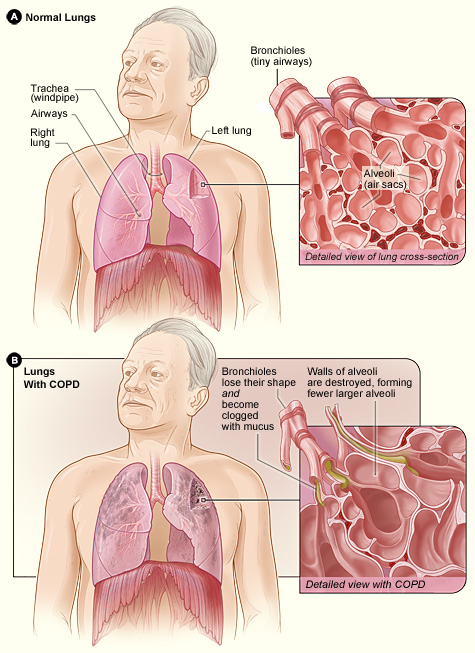
Normal lungs shown in upper diagram. Lungs damaged by COPD in the lower diagram with an inset showing a cross-section of bronchioles blocked by mucus and damaged alveoli.

COPD is a progressive lung disease characterized by narrowed airways, which prevent air from moving freely; excess mucus, which clogs air passages; and breakdown of lung tissue in small air sacs, which then fail to transfer oxygen into the bloodstream efficiently. Poor airflow due to lung damage (airflow limitation) tends to be chronic and incompletely reversible. Small airway disease (SAD) is the main driver of airflow limitation, through mechanisms of narrowing, chronic inflammation, and airway remodeling, while emphysema destroys air sacs and limits the transfer of oxygen. Those with COPD may have difficulty in breathing out fully (air trapping). If air cannot fully escape the lungs, the lungs may expand past their normal size (hyperinflation), increasing breathing difficulty.

The relative contributions of small airway disease and emphysema vary from person to person. There are sex differences in the anatomy of the respiratory system between men and women. Women tend to have smaller airway lumens and thicker airway walls, which may contribute to increased severity of COPD symptoms and frequency of COPD flare-ups for women.

COPD develops as a significant and chronic inflammatory response to inhaled irritants which ultimately leads to bronchial and alveolar remodelling in the lung known as small airways disease. Small airway disease (sometimes called chronic bronchiolitis) appears to be the precursor for the development of emphysema. Airway remodelling with narrowing of peripheral airway and emphysema are responsible for the alteration of lung function in COPD. Clearance of mucus from the airways is also altered with a dysregulation of cilia and mucus production.

The inflammatory cells involved can include neutrophils, eosinophils, and macrophages, types of white blood cells. Those who smoke additionally have cytotoxic T cell involvement. Part of this cell response is brought on by inflammatory mediators such as chemotactic factors. Other processes involved with lung damage include oxidative stress produced by high concentrations of free radicals in tobacco smoke and released by inflammatory cells and breakdown of the connective tissue of the lungs by proteases (particularly elastase) that are insufficiently inhibited by protease inhibitors. The destruction of the connective tissue of the lungs leads to emphysema, which then contributes to poor airflow and, finally, poor absorption and release of respiratory gases. General muscle wasting that often occurs in COPD may be partly due to inflammatory mediators released by the lungs into the bloodstream.

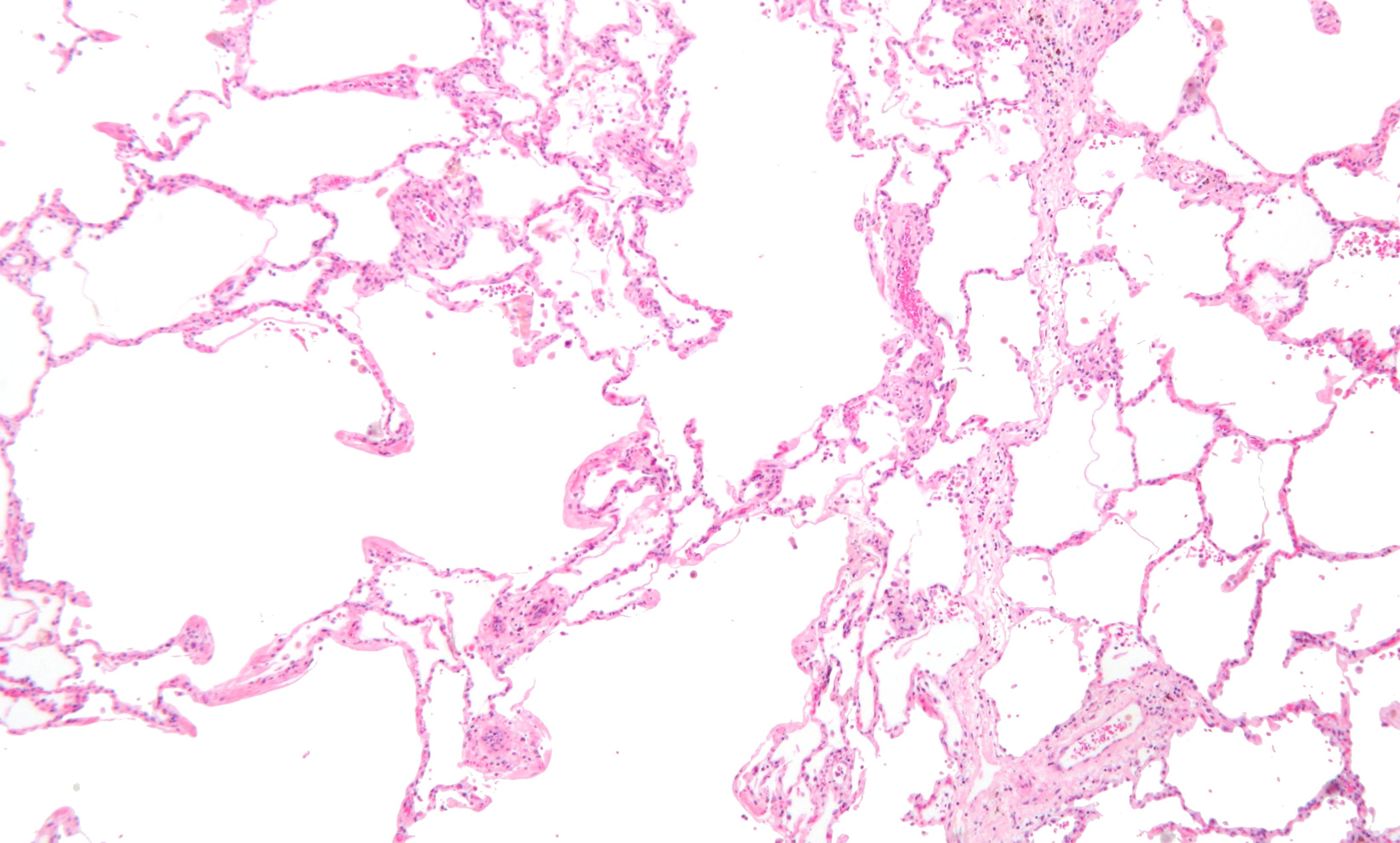
Micrograph showing emphysema (left – large empty spaces) and lung tissue with relative preserved alveoli (right)

Narrowing of the airways occurs due to inflammation and subsequent scarring within them. This contributes to the inability to breathe out fully. The greatest reduction in airflow occurs during breathing out, as the pressure in the chest compresses the airways at this time. This can result in more air from the previous breath remaining within the lungs when the next breath is started, resulting in an increase in the total volume of air in the lungs at any given time, a process called air trapping, which is closely followed by hyperinflation. Hyperinflation from exercise is linked to shortness of breath in COPD, as breathing in is less comfortable when the lungs are already partly filled. Hyperinflation may also worsen during an exacerbation. There may also be airway hyperresponsiveness to irritants similar to those found in asthma.

Low oxygen levels and eventually, high carbon dioxide levels in the blood, can occur from poor gas exchange due to decreased ventilation from airway obstruction, hyperinflation, and a reduced desire to breathe. During exacerbations, airway inflammation is also increased, resulting in increased hyperinflation, reduced expiratory airflow, and worsening of gas transfer. This can lead to low blood oxygen levels, which, if present for a prolonged period, can result in narrowing of the arteries in the lungs, while emphysema leads to the breakdown of capillaries in the lungs. Both of these conditions may result in pulmonary heart disease also classically known as cor pulmonale.

== Diagnosis ==
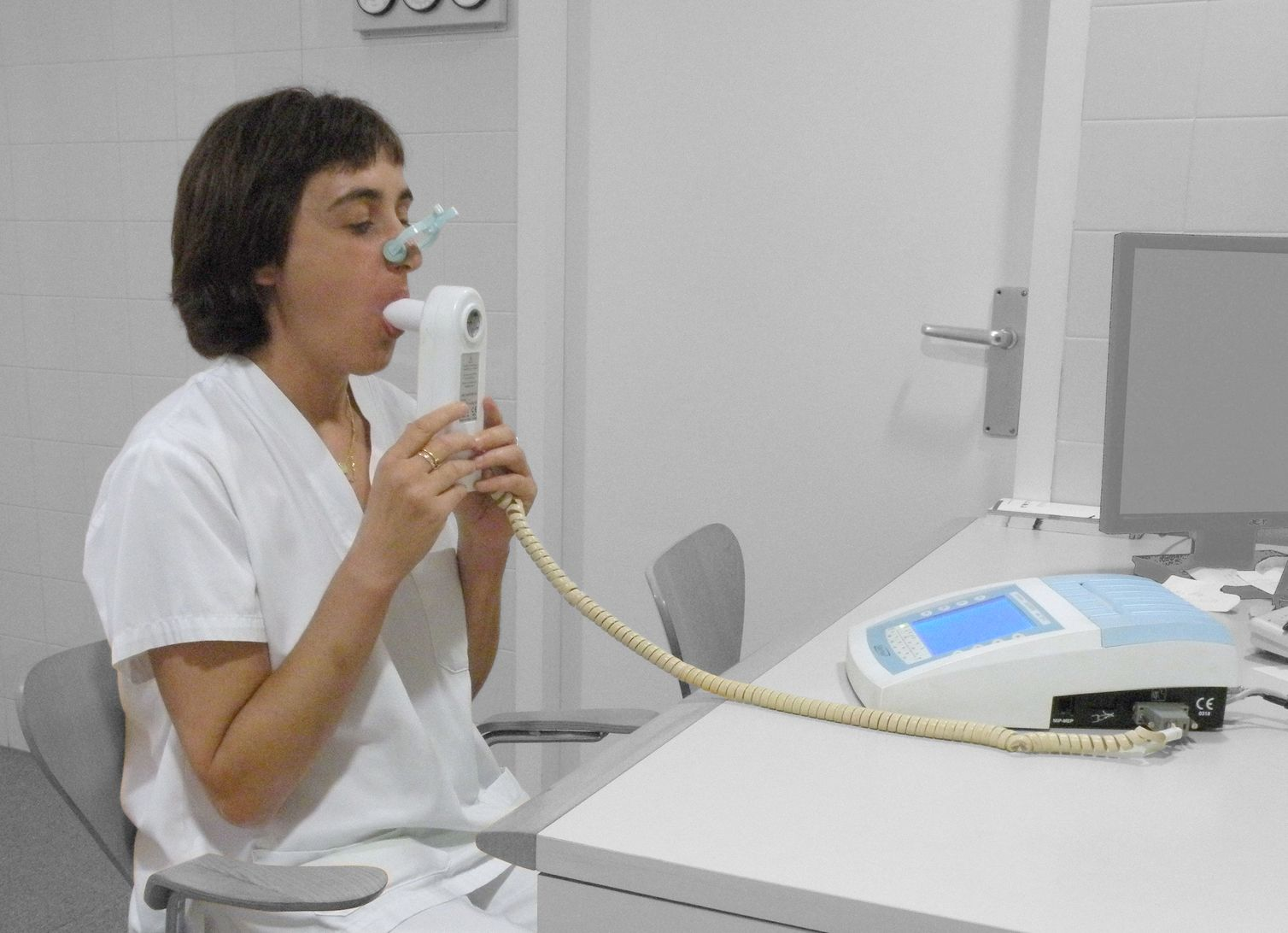
A person blowing into a spirometer. Smaller handheld devices are available for office use.

The diagnosis of COPD should be considered in anyone over the age of 35 to 40 with shortness of breath, a chronic cough, coughing up of mucus, or frequent winter colds, and a history of exposure to risk factors for the disease. Spirometry is then used to confirm the diagnosis.

GOLD initially classified COPD in terms of a 4-level staging system based on the severity of functional impairment. The 2023 GOLD report introduced a new definition of COPD, a new taxonomic classification of COPD based on contributory causes or etiotypes, and revised recommendations for diagnosis and assessment.

=== Spirometry ===
Spirometry measures the degree of airflow obstruction present and is generally carried out after the use of a bronchodilator, a medication to open up the airways. Two main components are measured to make the diagnosis, the forced expiratory volume in one second (FEV1), which is the greatest volume of air that can be breathed out in the first second of a breath and the forced vital capacity (FVC), which is the greatest volume of air that can be breathed out in a single large breath. Normally, 75–80% of the FVC comes out in the first second and a FEV1/FVC ratio less than 70% in someone with symptoms of COPD defines a person as having the disease. Because pulmonary function declines with ageing, use of this fixed threshold will lead to over-diagnosis of COPD in the elderly. FEV1 is typically expressed as a percentage of the predicted "normal" for the person's age, gender, height, and weight. Airflow obstruction that is not fully reversible also can be found in patients with asthma and other diseases. Testing the peak expiratory flow (the maximum speed of expiration), commonly used in asthma diagnosis, is not sufficient for the diagnosis of COPD.

Internationally, definitions for the diagnosis of COPD have changed over time. The British Thoracic Society (BTS) has required both FEV1/ FVC <0.70 and an additional criterion of FEV1 <80% predicted, based on the Health Survey for England (HSfE). National Institute for Health and Care Excellence (NICE) Guidelines for COPD followed the BTS criteria as of 2010. However, NICE was updated in 2019. NICE and GOLD now agree in requiring only the presence of clinical symptoms confirmed by airflow obstruction with a reduced FEV1/FVC ratio less than 0.7.

GOLD recommends further testing if symptoms seem out of proportion to the degree of obstruction. Pulmonary function tests (PFTs) such as diffusing capacity of the lung for carbon monoxide, airway resistance, and respiratory oscillometry may help assess lung function by detecting static lung hyperinflation, airway obstruction, and small airway dysfunction.

In those without symptoms, screening using spirometry is generally not recommended. However, active case finding and use of primary care data to identify those with risk factors, followed by spirometry, is recommended by GOLD 2024 as likely to lead to earlier diagnosis of COPD.

=== Assessment ===
MRC shortness of breath scale
Grade	Activity affected
1	Only strenuous activity
2	Vigorous walking
3	With normal walking
4	After a few minutes of walking
5	With changing clothing

GOLD criteria
Severity	FEV1% predicted
Mild (GOLD 1)	≥80
Moderate (GOLD 2)	50–79
Severe (GOLD 3)	30–49
Very severe (GOLD 4)	<30

Several methods can be used to assess the effects and severity of COPD. Use of screening questionnaires, such as the COPD diagnostic questionnaire (CDQ), alone or in combination with hand-held flow meters, is appropriate for screening of COPD in primary care. The MRC breathlessness scale or the COPD assessment test (CAT) are simple questionnaires that may be used. The St George Respiratory Questionnaire (SGRQ), can be used with patients who have chronic bronchitis to identify patients at risk of COPD exacerbation.

Spirometry may help to determine the severity of airflow limitation. GOLD also refers to a modified MRC scale that is simply a test of breathlessness experienced. Scores on CAT range from 0–40 with the higher the score, the more severe the disease.

As of 2023, GOLD updated its guidelines, revising its assessment approach. Once a COPD diagnosis has been confirmed by spirometry, assessment focuses on the degree of airflow limitation, type and degree of other current symptoms, history of exacerbations, and multimorbidities. GOLD's 2023 model recognizes that exacerbations are an important risk factor independent of the level of other symptoms. Patients are classified as A, B, or E. Patients are considered class E if they have a history in the past year of 1 or more exacerbations leading to hospitalization, or 2 or more moderate exacerbations. Patients in Class A or B cannot have more than 1 moderate or severe exacerbation in the past year, not requiring hospital admission. Patients in Class A display a low symptom burden and low exacerbation risk. Patients in Class B display a higher symptom burden. Initial pharmacological treatment guidelines are suggested based on the presence in these categories.

=== Other tests ===
A chest X-ray is not useful to establish a diagnosis of COPD, but it can be used either to exclude other conditions or to include comorbidities such as pulmonary fibrosis and bronchiectasis. Characteristic signs of COPD on X-ray include hyperinflation (shown by a flattened diaphragm and an increased retrosternal air space) and lung hyperlucency. A saber-sheath trachea is a tracheal deformity that is also indicative of COPD.

A CT scan is not routinely used except to exclude bronchiectasis. Pulse oximetry measurement of peripheral oxygen saturation is recommended in people with clinical signs of respiratory failure or right heart failure. An analysis of arterial blood is recommended in those with a peripheral oxygen saturation of 92% or less to determine actual blood oxygen level and assess for high levels of carbon dioxide in the blood, which may have therapeutic implications such as need for non-invasive ventilation or oxygen supplementation. WHO recommends that all those diagnosed with COPD be screened for alpha-1 antitrypsin deficiency.

Chest X-ray demonstrating severe COPD, displaying small heart size in comparison to the lungs

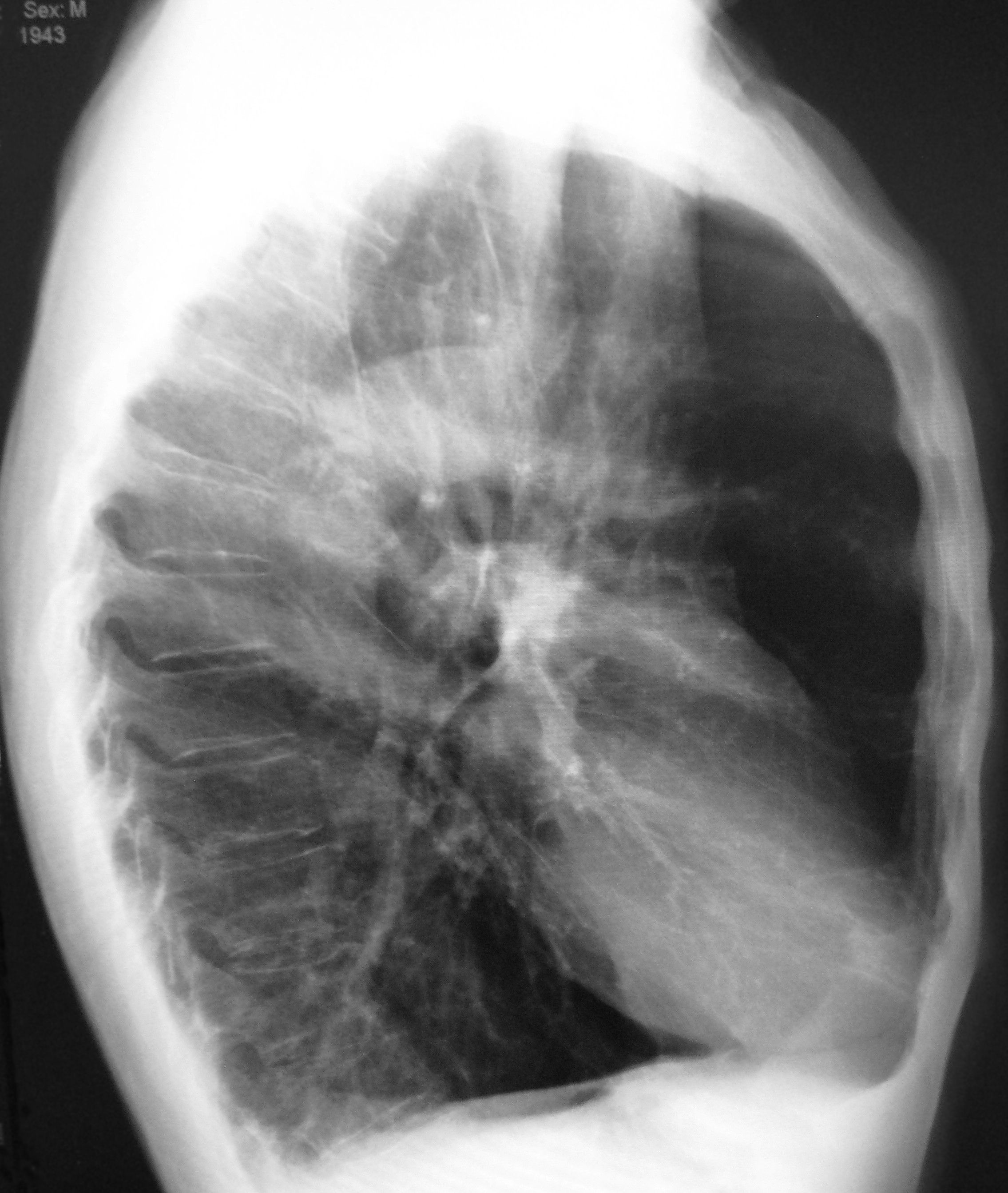
A lateral chest X-ray of a person with emphysema, displaying barrel chest and flat diaphragm

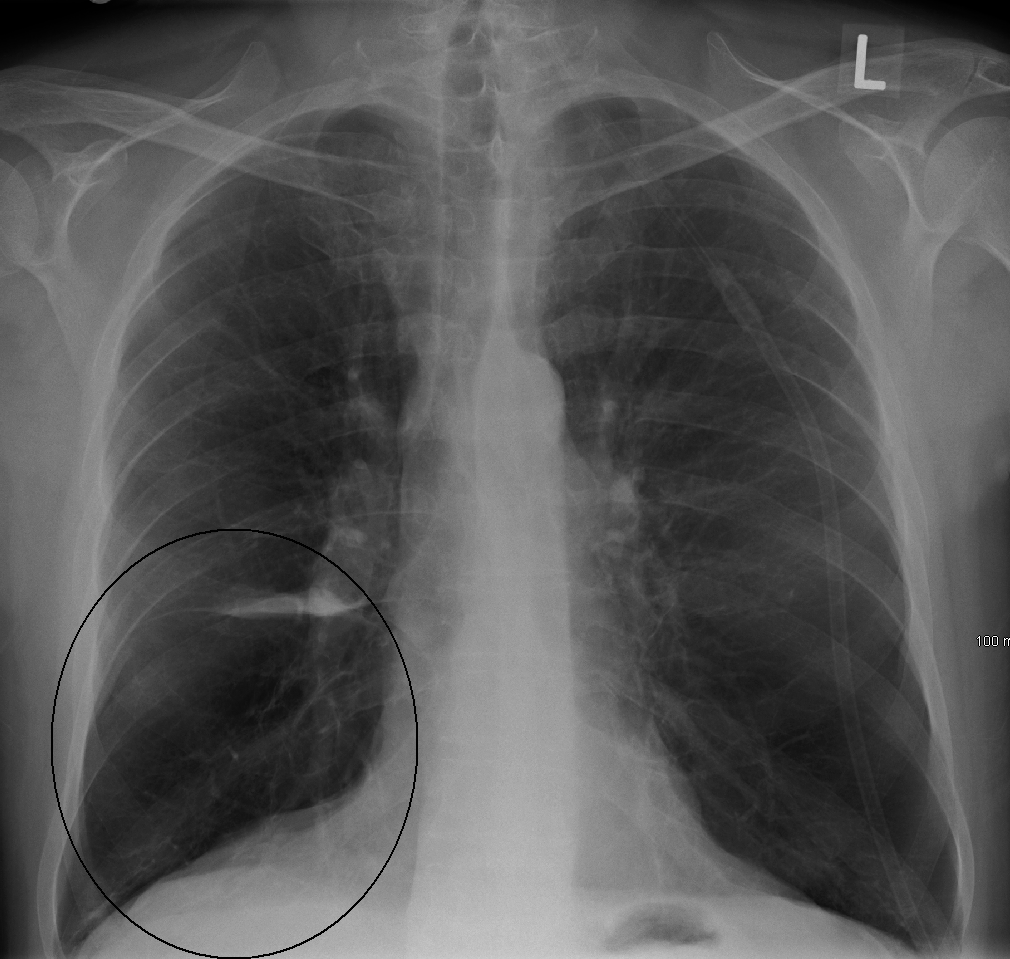
Lung bulla as seen on chest X-ray in a person with severe COPD

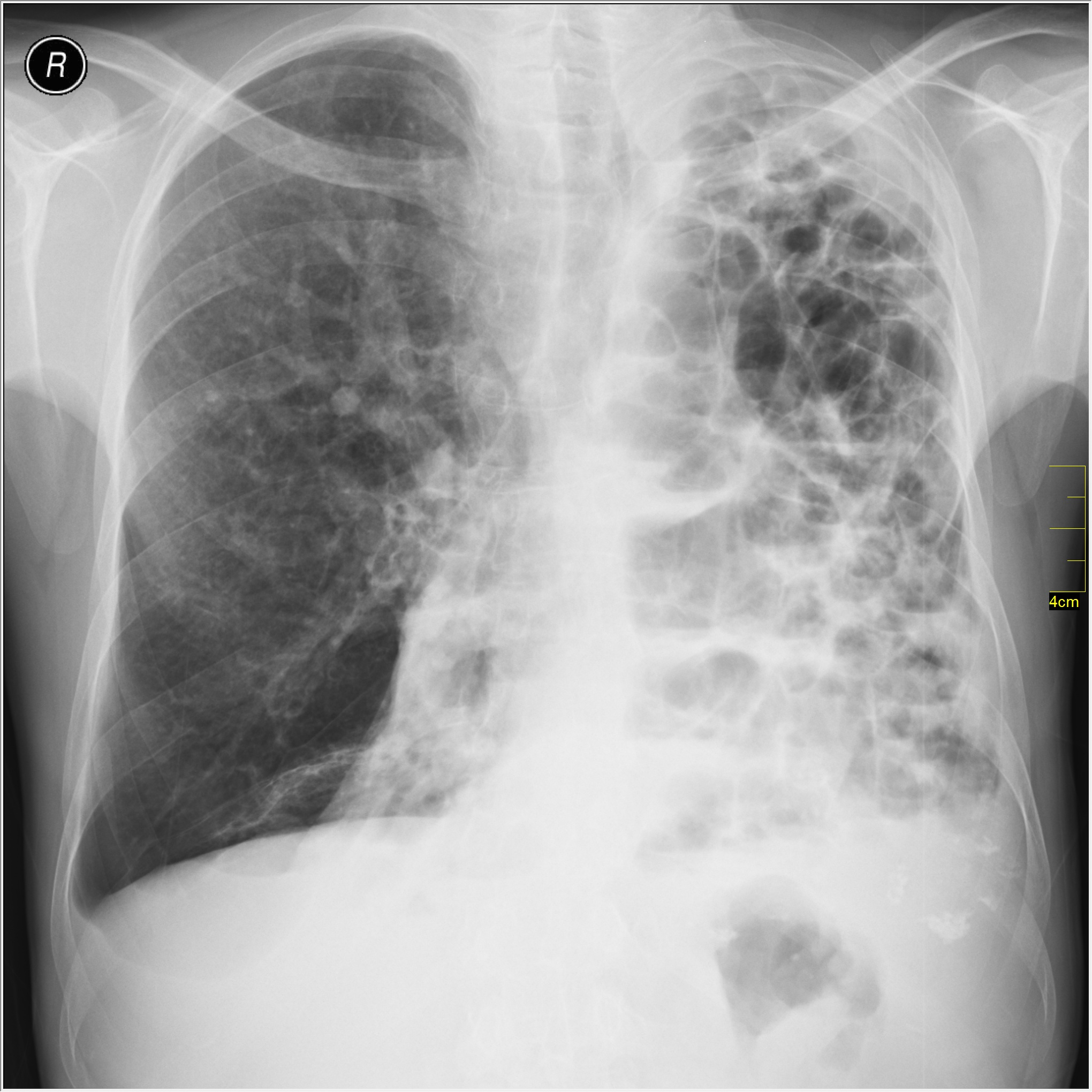
A severe case of bullous emphysema

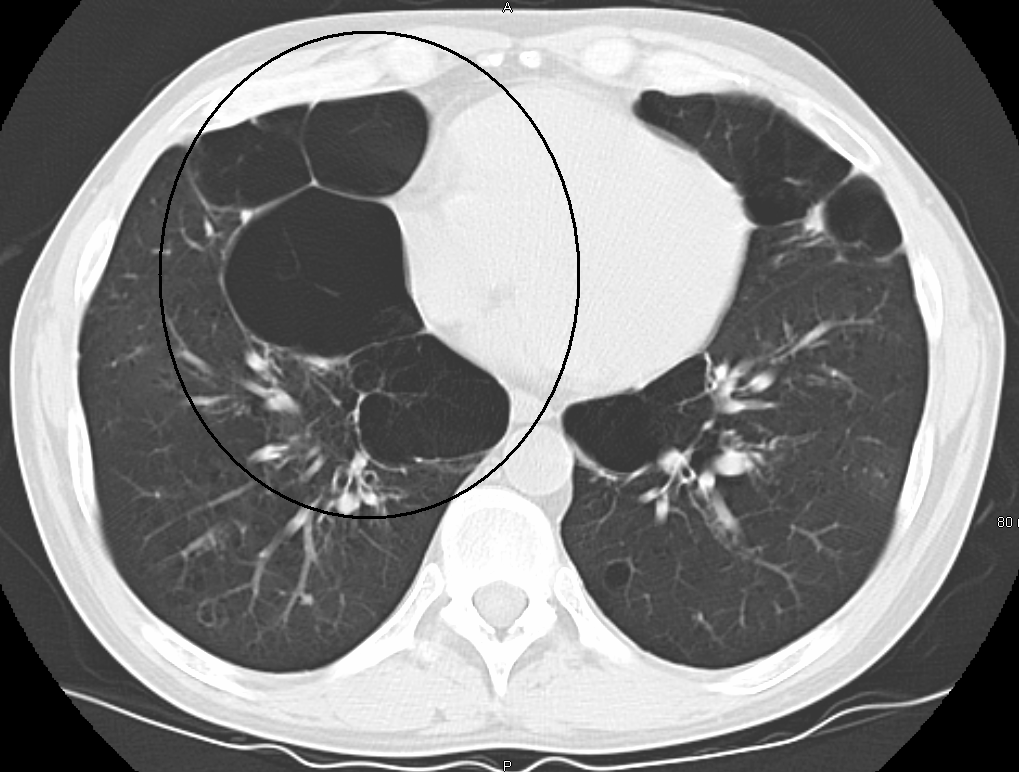
Axial CT image of the lung of a person with end-stage bullous emphysema

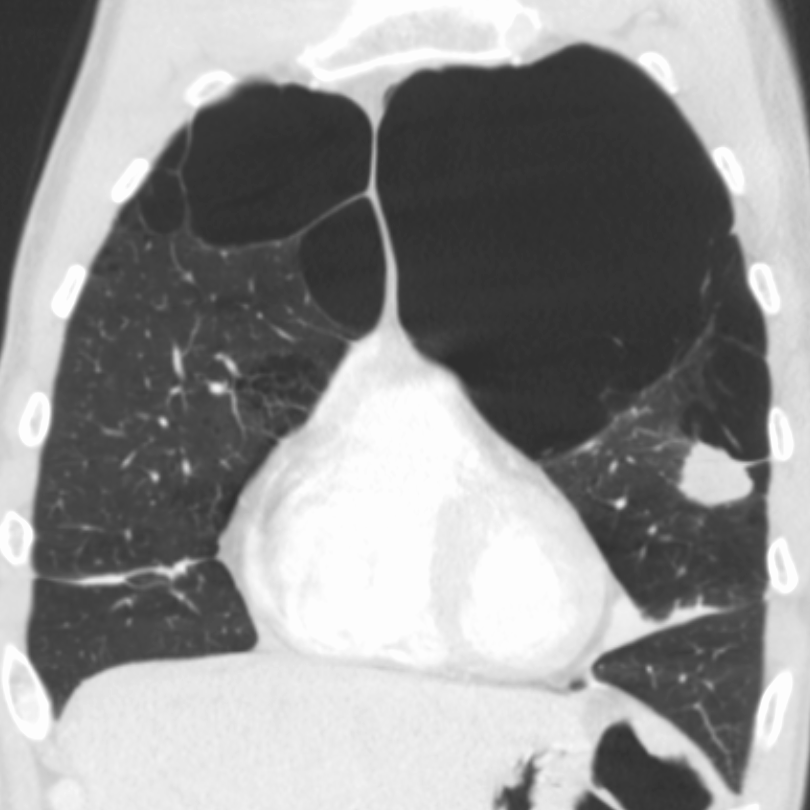
Very severe emphysema with lung cancer on the left (CT scan)

=== Differential diagnosis ===
COPD may need to be differentiated from other conditions such as congestive heart failure, asthma, bronchiectasis, tuberculosis, obliterative bronchiolitis, lung cancer, and diffuse panbronchiolitis. The key distinction between asthma and COPD is that in asthma, lung function should show significant improvement or return to normal with regular inhaled corticosteroid treatment. Airflow limitation that disappears following use of bronchodilators is incompatible with a diagnosis of COPD. Chronic bronchitis with normal airflow (NOCB) is not classified as COPD. However, those with NOCB have an increased risk of developing COPD and higher mortality.

== Prevention ==
Many cases of COPD are potentially preventable through decreasing exposure to tobacco smoke and other indoor and outdoor pollutants. It may also be possible to prevent the development of COPD in later life by improving conditions that affect lung development in early life, such as frequent respiratory illness, poor nutrition, low physical activity, and early alcohol consumption.

=== Smoking cessation ===
The policies of governments, public health agencies, and antismoking organizations can reduce smoking rates by discouraging people from starting and encouraging people to stop smoking. Smoking bans in public areas and places of work are important measures to decrease exposure to secondhand smoke, and while many places have instituted bans, more are recommended.

In those who smoke, stopping smoking is a crucial strategy shown to slow down the worsening of COPD. In the short term, quitting smoking can reduce respiratory symptoms. In the longer term, quitting can improve lung function, exercise capacity, perceived quality of life, and survival of those with COPD. It can reduce flare-ups and hospitalizations. Even at a late stage of the disease, it can reduce the rate of worsening lung function and delay the onset of disability and death. Quitting earlier in life and not smoking for longer periods (>10 years) show greater benefits.

Often, several attempts are required before long-term abstinence is achieved. Attempts over 5 years lead to success in nearly 40% of people. Some smokers can achieve long-term smoking cessation through willpower alone. Smoking, however, is highly addictive, and many smokers need further support. The chance of quitting is improved with social support, engagement in a smoking cessation program and the use of medications such as nicotine replacement therapy, bupropion, or varenicline. Combining smoking-cessation medication with behavioral therapy is more than twice as likely to be effective in helping people with COPD stop smoking, compared with behavioral therapy alone.

=== Occupational health ===
Measures to reduce occupation exposure in at-risk industries include public policy and regulation to support healthy workplaces; identifying risky work settings and exposures; actionable steps to reduce exposure to risk factors and triggers for flare-ups; education of workers, management and medical professionals about risks, diagnosis, and management; promoting smoking cessation; checking workers for early signs of COPD; and using equipment such as respirators for better control of dust and gases. Employers must provide a safe working environment, safeguarding employees through the use of ventilation, personal protection equipment, and regular air quality monitoring. Improving ventilation and using water spraying and dust suppressant techniques can help to reduce respirable dust. Education and training are important to ensure that methods are properly used.

=== Pollution control ===
Both indoor and outdoor air quality can be improved, which may prevent COPD and slow the worsening of existing disease. This may be achieved through public policy efforts, cultural changes, and personal involvement. Some countries have successfully improved outdoor air quality through regulations, resulting in improvements in the lung function of their populations.

Cities or other organizations may monitor air quality, sometimes sharing data with the public through air quality indices and alerts. Individuals are often advised to avoid or reduce exposure to irritants in indoor and outdoor pollution through smoking cessation, engaging in activities at times and places with lower pollutant exposure, and using protective gear (e.g., N95 masks, air filtration). It is becoming increasingly possible to monitor individual exposures to air pollution and adapt behavior accordingly.

In developing countries, a key effort is to reduce exposure to smoke from cooking and heating fuels through improved home ventilation and using cleaner fuels, stoves, and chimneys. Proper stoves may improve indoor air quality by 85%. Using alternative energy sources such as solar cooking and electrical heating is also effective. However, poverty is often a barrier to the adoption of better fuels. Higher-income families may use modern fuels such as natural gas or electricity, which cause less pollution and can lead to better health outcomes. Electricity supply, however, is often insufficient to meet a family's heating needs. If electricity is supplemented with low-quality biofuels, indoor air pollution levels will increase and negatively affect health outcomes.

== Management ==
COPD currently has no cure, but the symptoms are treatable and its progression can be delayed, particularly by stopping smoking. If COPD is detected early, while symptoms are still mild, interventions to prevent decline in lung function have a greater effect. For both individual treatment and public health, early diagnosis and intervention are recommended. Early prevention and treatment may improve quality of life and reduce flare-ups (exacerbations). In cases of early, mild COPD, pulmonary rehabilitation may help to improve exercise capacity and quality of life.

A major goal of management is to reduce exposure to risk factors, including offering non-pharmacological treatments, such as help with stopping smoking. Stopping smoking can reduce the rate of lung function decline and also reduce mortality from smoking-related diseases such as lung cancer and cardiovascular disease. Other recommendations include pneumococcal vaccination and yearly influenza vaccination to help reduce the risk of flare-ups; as of 2024 CDC and GOLD also recommend RSV vaccine for individuals above 60 years. COVID-19 vaccination is recommended in line with national guidelines.

Multiple illnesses often need to be managed along with COPD. An important approach is the use of an action plan, which is drawn up and reviewed with the patient and caregivers. Providing people with a personalized action plan, education, and support for use of their action plan in the event of a flare-up can reduce hospital visits and encourage early treatment of such exacerbations. When self-management interventions, such as taking corticosteroids and using supplemental oxygen, are combined with action plans, health-related quality of life is improved compared to usual care.

Several medical treatments are used to manage stable COPD and exacerbations. These include bronchodilators, corticosteroids and antibiotics.

Non-invasive ventilation may be used to support breathing and also reduce daytime breathlessness. Patients with COPD exacerbations can display acute hypercapnic respiratory failure (acutely raised levels of carbon dioxide). Bilevel positive airway pressure (BPAP) is preferred to continuous positive airway pressure (CPAP) in treating cases of cardiogenic pulmonary edema with hypercapnia.

In those with end-stage disease, palliative care is focused on relieving symptoms. Morphine can improve exercise tolerance.

=== Bronchodilators ===
Inhaled short-acting bronchodilators are the primary medications used on an as needed basis; their use regularly is not recommended. The two major types are beta2-adrenergic agonists and anticholinergics; either in long-acting or short-acting forms.

COPD is heterogeneous, and treatment must be individualized. Beta2–adrenergic agonists target receptors in the smooth muscle cells in bronchioles, causing them to relax and allow improved airflow. They reduce shortness of breath, tend to reduce dynamic hyperinflation, and improve exercise tolerance. Short-acting bronchodilators have an effect for four hours and for maintenance therapy long acting bronchodilators with an effect of over twelve hours are used. In times of more severe symptoms, a short-acting agent may be used in combination. An inhaled corticosteroid used with a long-acting beta-2 agonist is more effective than either one on its own. The 2018 NICE guideline recommends the use of dual long-acting bronchodilators, with economic modelling suggesting that this approach is preferable to starting one long-acting bronchodilator and adding another later.

The GOLD 2022 report recommends pharmacological treatment with a long-acting muscarinic antagonist (LAMA) such as tiotropium or a long-acting beta agonist (LABA) as initial monotherapy for most patients. Dual bronchodilator therapy (LABA+LAMA) is recommended for more severe symptoms. Other guidelines vary in recommending whether to try LABA or LAMA first. The GOLD 2023 report suggests trying either LAMA or LABA for patients in Class A; using combined LAMA+LABA for those in Group B or E; and LAMA+LABA+ICS for those in Group E with high blood eosinophil counts. American Thoracic Society guidelines strongly recommend LABA+LAMA combination therapy over LAMA or LABA monotherapy in patients with COPD and dyspnea or exercise intolerance. The combination of LABA+LAMA may reduce COPD exacerbations and improve quality-of-life compared to long-acting bronchodilators alone.

Several short-acting β_{2} agonists are available, including salbutamol (albuterol) and terbutaline. They provide relief of symptoms for four to six hours. A long-acting beta agonist (LABA) such as salmeterol, formoterol, and indacaterol is often used as maintenance therapy, with a duration of action of 12 to 24 hours. Indacaterol requires an inhaled dose once a day and is as effective as the other long-acting β_{2} agonist drugs that require twice-daily dosing for people with stable COPD. Long-term use of LABAs and LAMAs separately or in combination appear safe for COPD, with combination therapy improving lung function and quality of life and reducing COPD symptoms, first moderate/severe exacerbation risk, risk of first clinically important deterioration (CID), and use of rescue medication. In severe cases, triple therapy of LABA+LAMA with inhaled steroids (ICS) has some evidence of benefits. In patients with a high risk of pneumonia, LABA+LAMA may be a safer treatment option than all three together (LABA+LAMA+ICS) since adding ICS increases the risk of pneumonia.

The two main anticholinergics used in COPD are ipratropium and tiotropium. Ipratropium is a short-acting muscarinic antagonist (SAMA), while tiotropium is long-acting muscarinic antagonist (LAMA). Tiotropium is associated with improved lung function, quality of life, and exercise endurance, and reduced shortness of breath, hyperinflation, exacerbations, rescue medication use, hospitalization rates, and mortality. Tiotropium provides those benefits better than ipratropium. Anticholinergics can cause dry mouth, and urinary tract symptoms (in men) . Long-acting antimuscarinic agents (LAMA) are not associated with increased risk of heart disease. Aclidinium, another long-acting agent, also shows less shortness of breath, increases in lung function and improved quality of life. The LAMA umeclidinium bromide is another anticholinergic alternative. When compared to tiotropium, the LAMAs aclidinium, glycopyrronium, and umeclidinium appear to have a similar level of efficacy, with all four being more effective than placebo.

=== Corticosteroids ===
Inhaled corticosteroids are anti-inflammatories that are recommended by GOLD as a first-line maintenance treatment in COPD cases with repeated flare-ups. Their regular use increases the risk of pneumonia in severe cases. Studies have shown that the risk of pneumonia is associated with all types of corticosteroids: it is related to the disease severity and a dose-response relationship has been noted. Oral glucocorticoids can be effective in treating an acute exacerbation. They appear to have fewer side effects than those given intravenously. Five days of steroids work as well as ten or fourteen days.

The use of corticosteroids is associated with a decrease in the number of lymphoid follicles (in the bronchial lymphoid tissue). A triple inhaled therapy of LABA/LAMA/ICS improves lung function, reduces symptoms and exacerbations and is seen to be more effective than mono or dual therapies. NICE guidelines recommend the use of ICSs in people with asthmatic features or features suggesting steroid responsiveness.

=== PDE4 inhibitors ===
Phosphodiesterase-4 inhibitors (PDE4 inhibitors) are anti-inflammatories that improve lung function and reduce exacerbations in moderate-to-severe illness. Roflumilast is a PDE4 inhibitor used orally once daily to reduce inflammation; it has no direct bronchodilatory effects. It is used to treat those with chronic bronchitis, along with systemic corticosteroids. Reported adverse effects of roflumilast appear early in treatment, become less with continued treatment, and are reversible. One effect is dramatic weight loss, and its use is to be avoided in underweight people. It is also advised to be used with caution in those who have depression.

=== Antibiotics ===
In hospitalized patients and those with a severe exacerbation, antibiotics can improve outcomes. The macrolide class of antibiotics (e.g. azithromycin) is effective in reducing frequency of exacerbations. There is no clear evidence of improved outcomes for their use with less severe cases. Routine use of antibiotics is not recommended in mild or outpatient cases without signs of bacterial infection. The FDA recommends against the use of fluoroquinolones when other options are available due to higher risks of serious side effects.

Long-term preventive use of antibiotics is not recommended in COPD patients with frequent exacerbations. A major concern is the development of bacterial resistance, which has been shown. Long-term use may also reduce microbial diversity in the respiratory tract. Other side effects include hearing loss, tinnitus and changes to the heart rhythm known as long QT syndrome.

There is evidence that the macrolide class of antibiotics (e.g., azithromycin, clarithromycin, erythromycin) reduces the frequency of exacerbations. Whether this is a result of antibacterial or immunomodulant properties is not clear. Effects on airway inflammation are uncertain, but reductions in neutrophil cell counts are significant. Azithromycin has been suggested as the most promising of the macrolides due to better patient adherence, dose management, and tolerability of side effects. However, administration should be very cautious: serious side effects can occur, including increases in antibiotic resistance. Roxithromycin, a macrolide, and moxifloxacin, a quinolone, did not significantly improve exacerbation rates. Moxifloxacin and doxycycline may even increase exacerbation rates, suggesting these classes (fluoroquinolones and tetracyclines) are ineffective.

=== Other medications ===
Methylxanthines such as theophylline are widely used. Theophylline has a mild bronchodilatory effect in stable COPD. Inspiratory muscle function improves, but the causal effect is unclear. Theophylline improves breathlessness when used as an add-on to salmeterol. All instances of improvement have been reported using sustained-release preparations. Methylxanthines are not recommended for use in exacerbations due to adverse effects.

Mucolytics may help reduce exacerbations in some people with chronic bronchitis, with fewer hospitalizations and fewer days of disability in one month. Erdosteine is recommended by NICE. GOLD also supports the use of some mucolytics that are advised against when inhaled corticosteroids are being used and singles out erdosteine as having good effects regardless of corticosteroid use. Erdosteine also has antioxidant properties, but there is not enough evidence to support the general use of antioxidants. Erdosteine has been shown to significantly reduce the risk of exacerbations, shorten their duration, and hospital stays.

Cough medicines are not recommended. Beta blockers are not contraindicated for those with COPD and should only be used where there is concomitant cardiovascular disease. Metformin is not efficient in people without concurrent type 2 diabetes.

=== Oxygen therapy ===
Supplemental oxygen is recommended for those with low oxygen levels in respiratory failure at rest (a partial pressure of oxygen less than 50–55 mmHg or oxygen saturations of less than 88%). When taking into account complications including cor pulmonale and pulmonary hypertension, the levels involved are 56–59 mmHg. Oxygen therapy is to be used for between 15 and 18 hours per day and is said to decrease the risk of heart failure and death. In those with normal or mildly low oxygen levels, oxygen supplementation (ambulatory) may improve shortness of breath when given during exercise, but may not improve breathlessness during normal daily activities or affect the quality of life. During acute exacerbations, many require oxygen therapy; the use of high concentrations of oxygen without taking into account a person's oxygen saturations may lead to increased levels of carbon dioxide and worsened outcomes. In those at high risk of high carbon dioxide levels, oxygen saturations of 88–92% are recommended, while for those without this risk, recommended levels are 94–98%. Once prescribed long-term oxygen therapy, patients should be re-assessed after 60 to 90 days, to determine whether supplemental oxygen is still indicated and if prescribed supplemental oxygen is effective.

=== Rehabilitation ===
Pulmonary rehabilitation is a program of exercise, disease management, and counseling, coordinated to benefit the individual. A severe exacerbation leads to hospital admission, high mortality, and a decline in the ability to carry out daily activities. Following a hospital admission, pulmonary rehabilitation has been shown to significantly reduce future hospital admissions, mortality, and improve quality of life.

The optimal exercise routine, use of noninvasive ventilation during exercise and intensity of exercise suggested for people with COPD, is unknown. Performing endurance arm exercises improves arm movement for people with COPD and may result in a small improvement in breathlessness. Performing arm exercises alone does not appear to improve quality of life. Pursed-lip breathing exercises may be useful. Tai chi exercises appear to be safe to practice for people with COPD and may be beneficial for pulmonary function and pulmonary capacity when compared to a regular treatment program. Tai Chi was not found to be more effective than other exercise intervention programs. Inspiratory and expiratory muscle training (IMT, EMT) have been suggested and may provide some improvements when compared to no treatment. A combination of IMT and walking exercises at home may help limit breathlessness in cases of severe COPD. Additionally, the use of low amplitude high velocity joint mobilization together with exercise improves lung function and exercise capacity. The goal of spinal manipulation therapy is to improve thoracic mobility in an effort to reduce the work on the lungs during respiration, however, the evidence supporting manual therapy for people with COPD is very weak.

Airway clearance techniques (ACTs), such as postural drainage, percussion/vibration, autogenic drainage, hand-held positive expiratory pressure (PEP) devices and other mechanical devices, may reduce the need for increased ventilatory assistance, the duration of ventilatory assistance and the length of hospital stay in people with acute COPD. In people with stable COPD, ACTs may lead to short-term improvements in health-related quality of life and a reduced long-term need for hospitalizations related to respiratory issues.

=== Nutrition ===
Being either underweight or overweight can affect the symptoms, degree of disability, and prognosis of COPD. People with COPD who are underweight can improve their breathing muscle strength by increasing their calorie intake. When combined with regular exercise or a pulmonary rehabilitation program, this can lead to improvements in COPD symptoms. Supplemental nutrition may be useful in those who are malnourished.

In those with COPD who are malnourished, supplementation with vitamin C, vitamin E, zinc and selenium can improve weight, strength of respiratory muscles and health-related quality of life. Significant vitamin D deficiency is common in those with COPD and may cause increased exacerbations.

=== Psychological ===
Anxiety, depression and fatigue in COPD may be reduced by pulmonary rehabilitation, cognitive behavioral therapy and mind–body interventions such as mindfulness. The efficacy of antidepressants in people with COPD is inconclusive.

=== Management of exacerbations ===
People with COPD can experience exacerbations (flare-ups) that commonly start with respiratory tract infections. The symptoms that worsen are not specific to COPD, and differential diagnoses need to be considered. Acute exacerbations are typically treated by increasing the use of short-acting bronchodilators, including a combination of a short-acting inhaled beta agonist and short-acting anticholinergic. These medications can be given either via a metered-dose inhaler with a spacer or via a nebulizer, with both appearing to be equally effective. Nebulization may be easier for those who are more unwell. Oxygen supplementation can be useful. Excessive oxygen; however, can result in increased CO_{2} levels and a decreased level of consciousness. Corticosteroids given orally can improve lung function and shorten hospital stays but their use is recommended for only five to seven days; longer courses increase the risk of pneumonia and death.

=== Room temperature ===
The World Health Organization (WHO) recommends indoor temperatures of range between 18 and 24 °C (64 and 75 °F).

=== Room humidity ===
For people with COPD, the ideal indoor humidity levels are 30–50% RH. Maintaining indoor humidity can be difficult in the winter, especially in cold climates where the heating system is constantly running.

=== Procedures for emphysema ===
There are several procedures to reduce the volume of a lung in cases of severe emphysema with hyperinflation.

==== Surgical ====
For severe emphysema that has proved unresponsive to other therapies lung volume reduction surgery (LVRS) may be an option. LVRS involves the removal of damaged tissue, which improves lung function by allowing the rest of the lungs to expand. It is considered when the emphysema is in the upper lobes and when there are no comorbidities.

==== Bronchoscopic ====
Minimally invasive bronchoscopic procedures may be carried out to reduce lung volume. These include the use of valves, coils, or thermal ablation. Endobronchial valves are one-way valves that may be used in those with severe hyperinflation resulting from advanced emphysema; a suitable target lobe and no collateral ventilation are required for this procedure. The placement of one or more valves in the lobe induces a partial collapse of the lobe to reduce residual volume and improve lung function, exercise capacity, and quality of life.

The placement of nitinol coils instead of valves is recommended where there is collateral ventilation that would prevent the use of valves. Nitinol is a biocompatible alloy.

Both of these techniques are associated with adverse effects, including persistent air leaks and cardiovascular complications. Thermal vapor ablation has an improved profile. Heated water vapor is used to target lobe regions, which leads to permanent fibrosis and volume reduction. The procedure can target individual lobe segments, can be carried out regardless of collateral ventilation, and can be repeated with the natural advance of emphysema.

==== Other surgeries ====
In very severe cases, lung transplantation might be considered. A CT scan may be useful in surgery considerations. Ventilation/perfusion scintigraphy is another imaging method that may be used to evaluate cases for surgical interventions and also to evaluate post-surgery responses. A bullectomy may be carried out when a giant bulla occupies more than a third of a hemithorax.

== Prognosis ==
Chronic obstructive pulmonary disease deaths per million persons in 2012: 9–63 64–80 81–95 96–116 117–152 153–189 190–235 236–290 291–375 376–1089

Disability-adjusted life years lost to chronic obstructive pulmonary disease per 100,000 inhabitants in 2004: no data ≤110 110–220 220–330 330–440 440–550 550–660 / 660–770 770–880 880–990 990–1100 1100–1350 ≥1350

COPD is progressive and can lead to premature death. It is estimated that 3% of all disability is related to COPD. The proportion of disability from COPD globally has decreased from 1990 to 2010 due to improved indoor air quality primarily in Asia. The overall number of years lived with disability from COPD, however, has increased.

There are many variables affecting the long-term outcome in COPD. GOLD recommends the use of a composite test (BODE) that includes the main variables of body-mass index, obstruction of airways, dyspnea (breathlessness), and exercise, and not just spirometry results. NICE recommends against the use of BODE for the prognosis assessment in stable COPD; factors such as exacerbations and frailty must be considered. Other factors that contribute to a poor outcome include older age, comorbidities such as lung cancer and cardiovascular disease, and the number and severity of exacerbations needing hospital admission.

== Epidemiology ==
Estimates of prevalence vary considerably due to differences in analytical and surveying approaches and the choice of diagnostic criteria. An estimated 213 million people had COPD in 2021, corresponding to a global prevalence of 2.7%, whereas epidemiological studies indicated an estimation of 384 million having COPD in 2010, corresponding to a global prevalence of 12%.

The disease affects both men and women but risk is heavily influenced by age, gender, lifestyle, and socioeconomic factors, and prevalence varies with countries and regions. A higher rate of COPD is found in those over 40 years, and this increases greatly with advancing age, with the highest rate found in those over 60 years. When exposure factors are equal, women tend to be at higher risk of COPD, possibly reflecting sex differences in the anatomy of the respiratory system. In never-smokers, COPD is more common in women than men. However, men are more likely to smoke, the top risk factor.

A review of data from 201 countries between 1990 and 2021 shows a variety of changes in age-standardized prevalence and death rates of COPD. Rates in some countries increased, some were stable, and some decreased. Changes in prevalence appear to reflect changes in rates of smoking and air pollution. In addition, the use of biomass fuels for cooking is related to increased COPD prevalence, particularly in women, while gas cooking is related to reduced prevalence. The universal thermal climate index and various climatic conditions also correlate with COPD prevalence. Globally, incidence and mortality rates declined slightly between 1990 and 2021, but this was not true for all demographics.

In 2023, COPD was the third-leading cause of death globally. In low-income countries, COPD does not appear in the top 10 causes of death; in other income groups, it is in the top 5. Around three million people die of COPD each year. Tobacco use, ambient air pollution, and socioeconomic factors are all associated with higher death rates. In some countries, mortality has decreased in men but increased in women. This may reflect rates of smoking in women and men becoming more similar.

In the UK, three million people are reported to be affected by COPD – two million of these being undiagnosed. On average, the number of COPD-related deaths between 2007 and 2016 was 28,600. The estimated number of deaths due to occupational exposure was estimated to be about 15%, at around 4,000.

In the United States in 2018, almost 15.7 million people had been diagnosed with COPD, and it is estimated that millions more have not been diagnosed. In the United States in 2021, about 11.7 million insured individuals were identified with COPD. There were 1.8 million COPD-related acute inpatient hospitalizations. Both COPD prevalence and COPD-related hospitalization rates varied widely among states.

== History ==
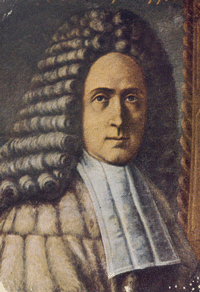
Giovanni Battista Morgagni, who made one of the earliest recorded descriptions of emphysema in 1769

The name chronic obstructive pulmonary disease is believed to have first been used in 1965. Previously, it has been known by several different names, including chronic obstructive bronchopulmonary disease, chronic airflow obstruction, chronic obstructive lung disease, nonspecific chronic pulmonary disease, and diffuse obstructive pulmonary syndrome.

The terms emphysema and chronic bronchitis were formally defined as components of COPD in 1959 at the CIBA guest symposium and in 1962 at the American Thoracic Society Committee meeting on Diagnostic Standards.

Early descriptions of probable emphysema began in 1679 by T. Bonet of a condition of "voluminous lungs" and in 1769 by Giovanni Morgagni of lungs which were "turgid particularly from air". In 1721, the first drawings of emphysema were made by Ruysh. René Laennec, used the term emphysema in his book A Treatise on the Diseases of the Chest and of Mediate Auscultation (1837) to describe lungs that did not collapse when he opened the chest during an autopsy. He noted that they did not collapse as usual because they were full of air and the airways were filled with mucus. In 1842, John Hutchinson invented the spirometer, which allowed the measurement of vital capacity of the lungs. However, his spirometer could only measure volume, not airflow. Tiffeneau and Pinelli in 1947 described the principles of measuring airflow.

Air pollution and the increase in cigarette smoking in Great Britain at the start of the 20th century led to high rates of chronic lung disease, though it received little attention until the Great Smog of London in December 1952. This spurred epidemiological research in the United Kingdom, the Netherlands, and elsewhere. In 1953, George L. Waldbott, an American allergist, first described a new disease he named smoker's respiratory syndrome in the 1953 Journal of the American Medical Association. This was the first association between tobacco smoking and chronic respiratory disease.

Modern treatments were developed during the second half of the 20th century. Evidence supporting the use of steroids in COPD was published in the late 1950s. Bronchodilators came into use in the 1960s following a promising trial of isoprenaline. Further bronchodilators, such as short-acting salbutamol, were developed in the 1970s and the use of long-acting bronchodilators began in the mid-1990s. Every year since 2002, World chronic obstructive pulmonary disease day (World COPD Day) is observed on the third Wednesday of November to raise public awareness about the disease.

== Society and culture ==
It is generally accepted that COPD is widely underdiagnosed, and many people remain untreated. In the US, the NIH has promoted November as COPD Awareness Month to be an annual focus on increasing awareness of the condition.

=== Economics ===
Globally, as of 2010, COPD was estimated to cost $2.1 trillion, half of which occurred in the developing world. Of this total an estimated $1.9 trillion are direct costs such as medical care, while $0.2 trillion are indirect costs such as missed work. This is expected to more than double by 2030. In Europe, COPD represents 3% of healthcare spending. In the United States, costs of the disease were estimated at $50 billion in 2010, most of which is due to exacerbation. In the United Kingdom, this cost was in 2021 estimated at £3.8 billion annually.

== Research ==
Stem-cell therapy using mesenchymal stem cells was in June 2021 studied in eight clinical trials had been completed and seventeen were underway.

The effectiveness of alpha-1 antitrypsin augmentation treatment for people who have alpha-1 antitrypsin deficiency is unclear.

Metabolomic approaches to diagnosing and differentiating COPD subtypes are being studied.

Research continues into the use of telehealthcare to treat people with COPD when they experience episodes of shortness of breath; treating people remotely may reduce emergency-room visits and improve quality of life.

American people with COPD and their caregivers consider the following COPD-related research areas as the most important: family/social/community research, well-being of people with COPD, curative research, biomedical therapies, policy, and holistic therapies.

== Other animals ==
Chronic obstructive pulmonary disease may occur in several other animals and may be caused by exposure to tobacco smoke. In horses it is known as recurrent airway obstruction (RAO) or heaves. RAO can be quite severe and most often is linked to exposure to common allergens. COPD is also commonly found in old dogs.
