= Air trapping =

Abnormal retention of air in the lungs

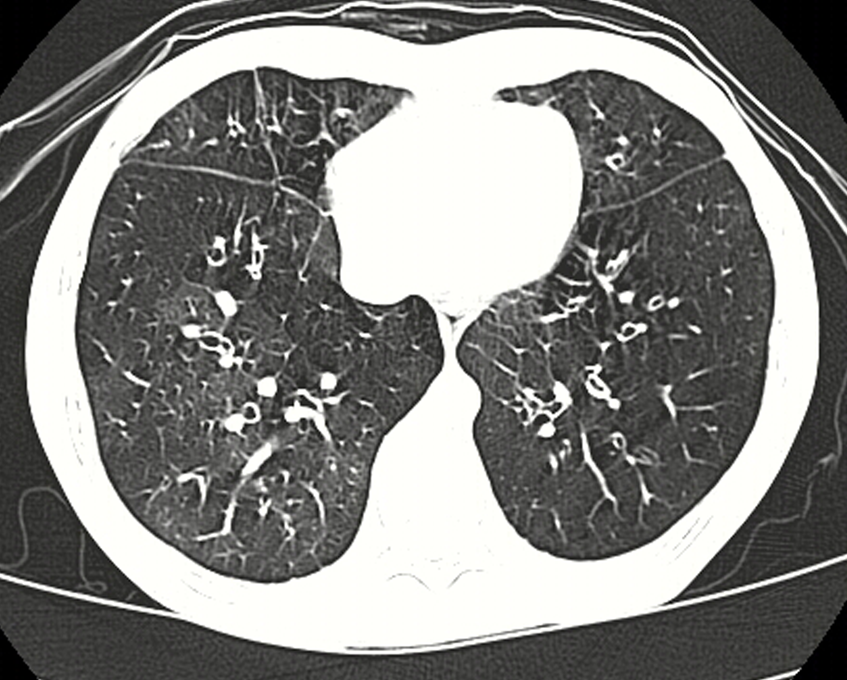
A CT image showing bronchiolitis obliterans with ground glass pattern, air trapping and bronchial thickening.

Air trapping, also called gas trapping, is an abnormal retention of air in the lungs where it is difficult to exhale completely. It is observed in obstructive lung diseases such as asthma, bronchiolitis obliterans syndrome and chronic obstructive pulmonary diseases such as emphysema and chronic bronchitis.

Air trapping is not a diagnosis but is a presentation of an illness, and can be a guide to the appropriate differential diagnosis.

== Imaging ==
Computed tomography (CT) is the most sensitive imaging modality for detecting air trapping. On inspiratory CT scans, air trapping may appear as areas of decreased attenuation (darker areas), often described as mosaic attenuation. The diagnostic hallmark is persistence of these low-attenuation areas on expiratory CT, during which normal lung parenchyma increases in attenuation (or becomes whiter) while trapped air remains lucent. Expiratory imaging is therefore essential for confirming air trapping and distinguishing it from vascular causes of mosaic attenuation.

== Measurement and function ==
Exhaled volumes are measured by a pulmonary function test or simple spirometry, leading to an elevated residual volume and a measurement of forced expiratory volume. Air trapping is often incidentally diagnosed on computed tomography (CT) scanning. On expiratory films, retained hyperlucent gas will be visualised in cases of air trapping.

Air trapping represents poorly aerated lung, but on its own is clinically benign. It is a common problem for smokers who dive. On diving the lung volume collapses and pushes air into the poorly aerated regions. On arising from a deep depth, these air-trapped areas of lung expand. This places great pressure on the lung tissue which can rupture.
