= Pursed-lip breathing =

Act of exhaling through tightly pressed, pursed lips

Pursed-lip breathing (PLB) is a breathing technique that consists of exhaling through tightly pressed (pursed) lips and inhaling through the nose with the mouth closed.

== Uses ==
Pursed-lip breathing can help to ease shortness of breath in people with a variety of lung problems. It can be used effectively during asthma attacks to slow breathing and reduce the work of breathing.

Physicians, nurses, physical therapists, occupational therapists, and respiratory therapists teach this technique to their patients to ease shortness of breath and to promote deep breathing, also referred to as abdominal or diaphragmatic breathing. The purpose of PLB is to create back-pressure inside airways to splint them open; moving air thus takes less work.

Breathing through pursed lips on both exhalation and inhalation is one of the signs that health workers use to detect possible chronic obstructive pulmonary disease (COPD) in patients. COPD Canada suggests that using PLB has positive effects in treating stress- and anxiety-related disorders.

== Mechanism of action ==
Pursed-lip breathing increases positive pressure generated in the conducting branches of the lungs. This can hold open bronchioles in patients with high lung compliance, such as those with emphysema.

Pursed-lip breathing also accesses the parasympathetic nervous system, which reduces stress during episodes of shortness of breath.
