= Saber-sheath trachea =

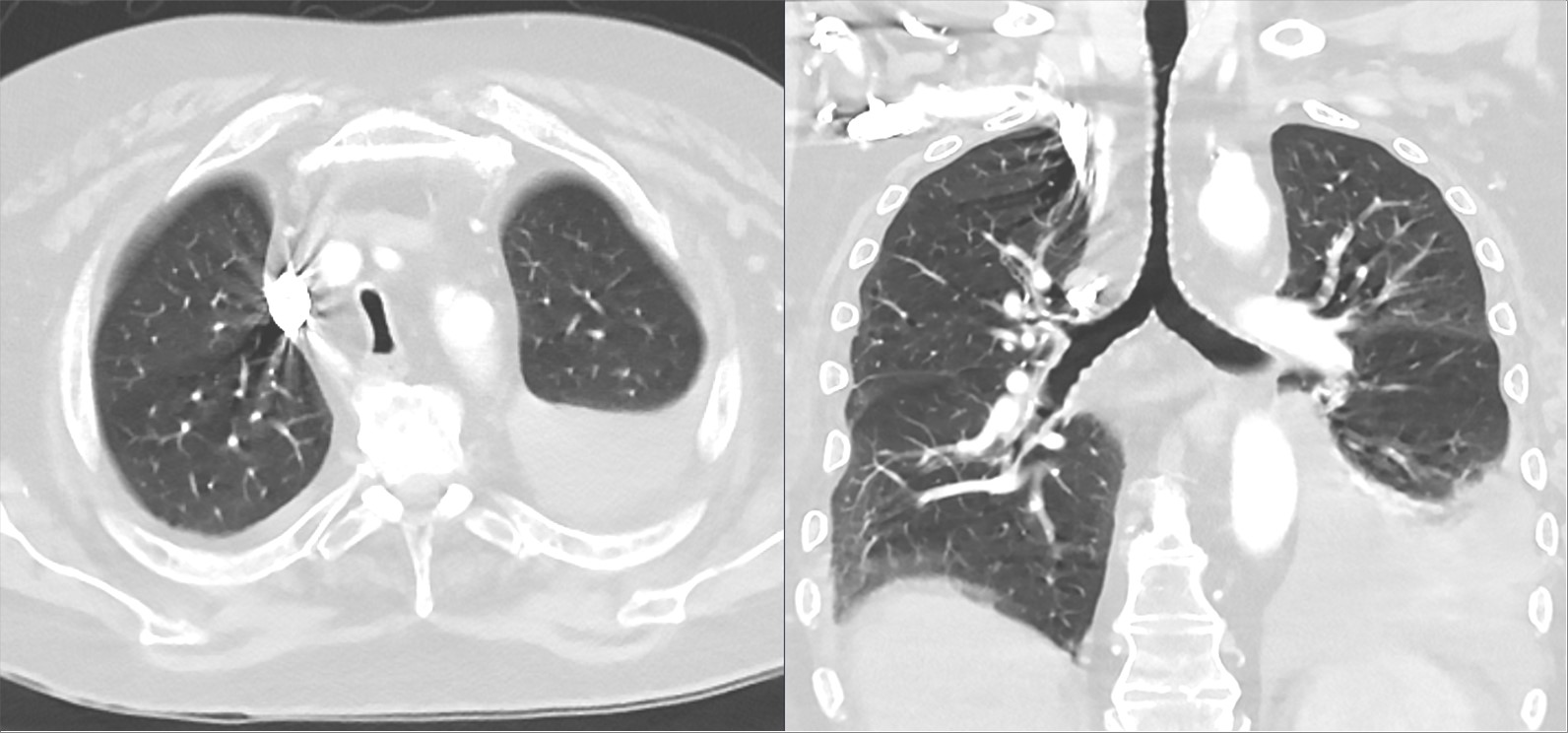
CT scan of a saber-sheath trachea in a patient with COPD

A saber-sheath trachea also known as scabbard trachea is a trachea that has an abnormal shape. This manifests as a narrowing of the portion of the trachea located within the thorax, and a widening of the diameter of the posterior area of the trachea. The lateral measurement of tracheal diameter decreases. In saber-sheath trachea, the inner wall of the trachea is smooth, there are no nodules or areas of thickening.

The trachea is a cartilaginous and tubular structure which serves as the main airway, carrying air from the nose and mouth to the lungs. The total length is variable and can range from 8 to 13 centimeters. The trachea's length spans both within the lung cavity, termed the intra-thoracic portion of the trachea, and outside the lung cavity, termed the extra-thoracic portion. The intra-thoracic portion is typically 6–9 centimeters in length, while the extra-thoracic portion is 2–4 centimeters in length. The trachea is supported by C-shaped rings of cartilage, which supports the trachea and prevents it from collapsing during exhalation. In men, a normal trachea will have a diameter measuring the distance from one side of the trachea to the other, termed the coronal diameter, of 13–25 millimeters, and in women the coronal diameter of a normal trachea will range from 10 to 21 millimeters. The diameter of the front side of the trachea to the back, termed the sagittal diameter, in men typically is from 13 to 27 millimeters and in women is 10–23 millimeters.

== Causes ==
It can occur in chronic obstructive pulmonary disease (COPD) or prolonged bilateral compression on it as in goitre. It is considered to be widely associated with COPD. During normal exhalation, the size of the trachea within the chest cavity becomes slightly smaller. This reduction is more noticeable for patients with COPD.

The underlying process leading to the formation of the saber-sheath shape of the trachea is not fully understood. There are many currently suggested theories however, which include:

1. Chronic coughing, which often occurs in patients with COPD, can lead to repeated injury to the cartilage of the trachea. The cycle of tracheal injury and repair can lead to structural changes, which may result in the saber-sheath shape.
2. For patients with COPD, and particularly those patients who have severe blockage in their airways, the trachea can become elongated. The elongation of the trachea places vertical stress on the cartilage rings supporting the trachea, which can lead to the formation of the saber-sheath shape. For patients with saber-sheath trachea, the narrowing of the trachea from side to side is thought to occur as a result of bending of the cartilaginous rings and the narrowing from front to back is thought to be due to inward bulging of the back wall of the trachea.
3. In COPD, due to the limitation of proper airflow in the lung secondary to the lungs inability to recoil and a decrease in a person's ability to appropriately exhale, patient's can develop lung hyperinflation. Lung hyperinflation is defined as the lungs retaining a higher than normal volume of air after exhalation due to underlying abnormalities.

== Parameters for diagnosis ==
Diagnosing a patient with saber-sheath trachea is based on calculating a value called the tracheal index. The tracheal index is measured by taking the ratio of the width of the trachea and the depth of the trachea using cross-sectional imaging. A tracheal index of 1.0 indicates that the trachea has a typical, appropriate rounded cross-section. A patient is considered to have saber-sheath trachea when the calculated tracheal index is below 0.67.

== Findings on imaging ==
On typical CT scans of the trachea, the normal appearance is oval, round, or horseshoe shaped. A saber-sheath trachea has distinct findings compared to normal tracheas on imaging, and may have additional features on CT besides intra-thoracic narrowing and widening diameter of the posterior portion. When cartilage becomes weak, as in saber-sheath trachea, CT scans can show the sides of the trachea curving inwards. This can be more apparent with forceful exhalation Moreover, the walls of the trachea within the thorax can also show slight thickening on CT. Another finding that can be seen is the hardening and becoming more bone-like of the cartilaginous rings in the trachea, a process called ossification.
