= Bullectomy =

Surgical removal of bullae from the lung

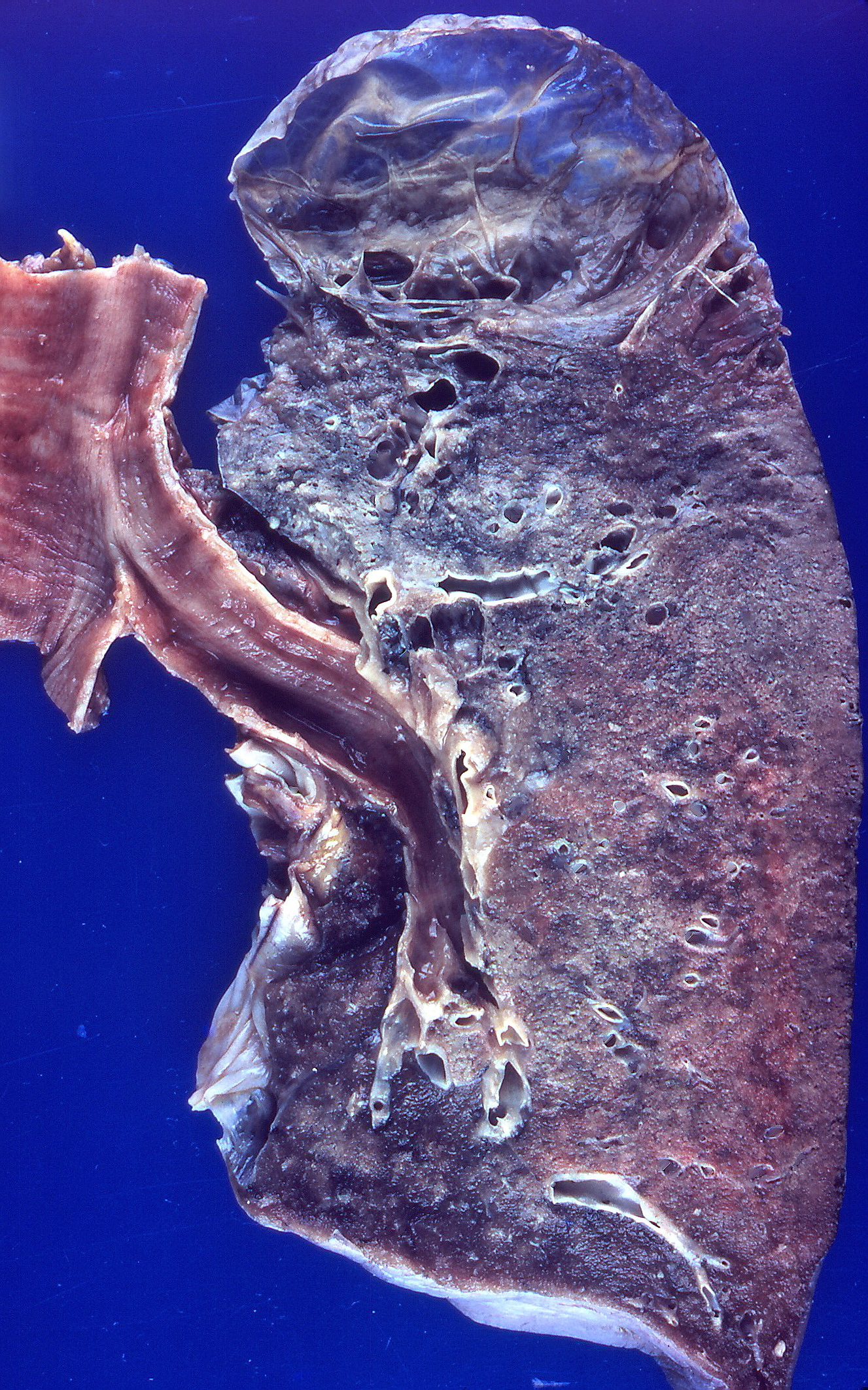
- Cross section of Bullous emphysema
- [edit on Wikidata]

Bullectomy is a surgical procedure in which dilated air-spaces or bullae in lung parenchyma are removed. Common causes of dilated air-spaces include chronic obstructive pulmonary disease and emphysema. Patients with giant bullae filling half the thoracic volume and compressing relatively normal adjacent parenchyma are recommended for bullectomy. It is also indicated in severe dyspnea, repeated respiratory infections and spontaneous pneumothorax. The size of dilated air-spaces or bullae volume is the most important factor in relation to ventilator capacity post-bullectomy. In cases where the size of bullae are enlarged, bullectomy is indicated if the percentage of forced expiratory volume in one second(FEV1%) is greater than 40% and the regional ventilation over volume dynamic(V/V Dynamic) is greater than 0.5.
