= FEV1/FVC ratio =

Ratio used in the diagnosis of lung disease

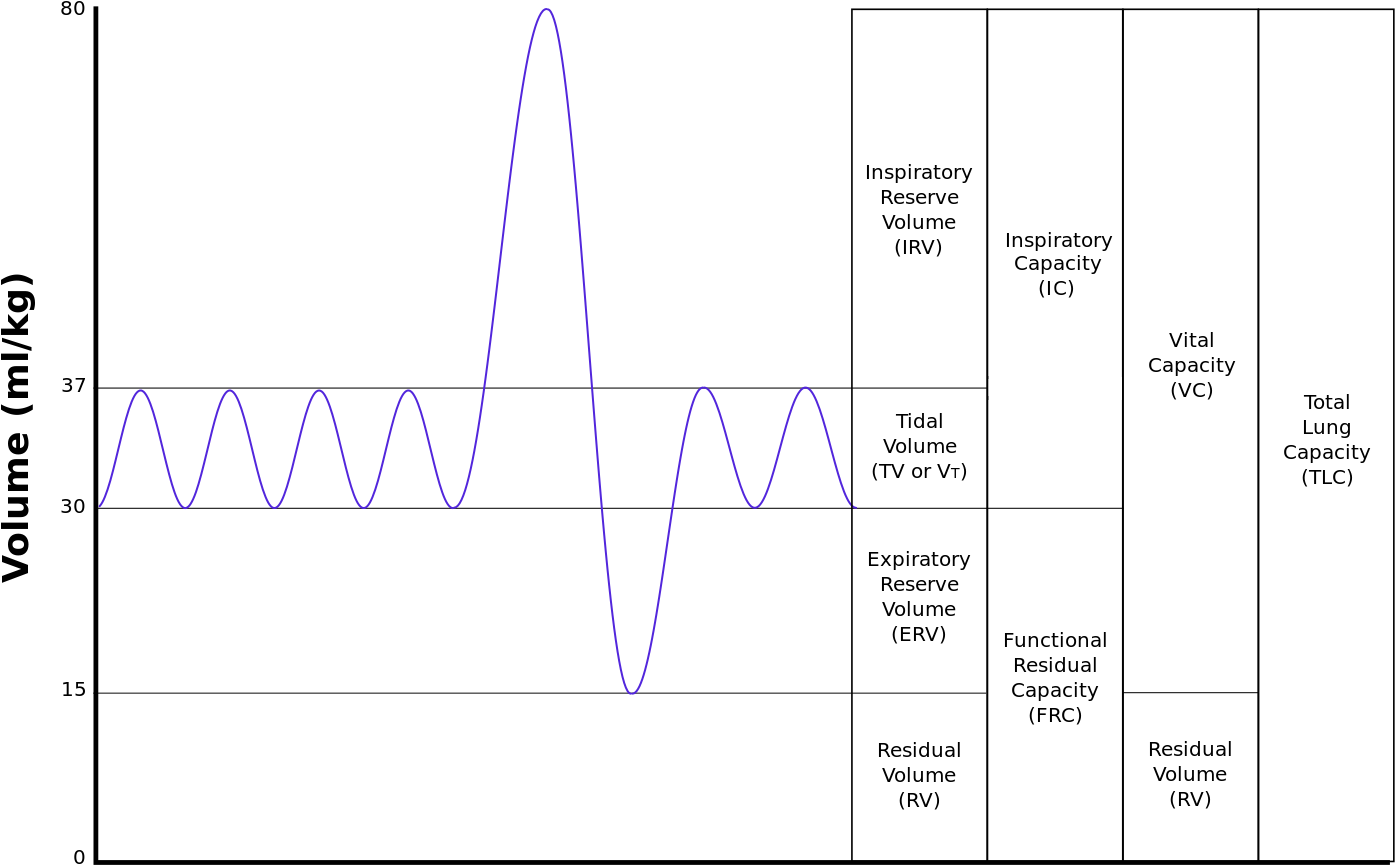
- TLC: Total lung capacity: the volume in the lungs at maximal inflation, the sum of VC and RV.
- TV: Tidal volume: that volume of air moved into or out of the lungs in 1 breath (TV indicates a subdivision of the lung; when tidal volume is precisely measured, as in gas exchange calculation, the symbol TV or V_{T} is used.)
- RV: Residual volume: the volume of air remaining in the lungs after a maximal exhalation
- ERV: Expiratory reserve volume: the maximal volume of air that can be exhaled from the end-expiratory position
- IRV: Inspiratory reserve volume: the maximal volume that can be inhaled from the end-inspiratory level
- IC: Inspiratory capacity: the sum of IRV and TV
- IVC: Inspiratory vital capacity: the maximum volume of air inhaled from the point of maximum expiration
- VC: Vital capacity: the volume of air breathed out after the deepest inhalation.
- V_{T}: Tidal volume: that volume of air moved into or out of the lungs during quiet breathing (VT indicates a subdivision of the lung; when tidal volume is precisely measured, as in gas exchange calculation, the symbol TV or V_{T} is used.)
- FRC: Functional residual capacity: the volume in the lungs at the end-expiratory position
- RV/TLC%: Residual volume expressed as percent of TLC
- V_{A}: Alveolar gas volume
- V_{L}: Actual volume of the lung including the volume of the conducting airway.
- FVC: Forced vital capacity: the determination of the vital capacity from a maximally forced expiratory effort
- FEV_{t}: Forced expiratory volume (time): a generic term indicating the volume of air exhaled under forced conditions in the first t seconds
- FEV_{1}: Volume that has been exhaled at the end of the first second of forced expiration
- FEF_{x}: Forced expiratory flow related to some portion of the FVC curve; modifiers refer to amount of FVC already exhaled
- FEF_{max}: The maximum instantaneous flow achieved during a FVC maneuver
- FIF: Forced inspiratory flow: (Specific measurement of the forced inspiratory curve is denoted by nomenclature analogous to that for the forced expiratory curve. For example, maximum inspiratory flow is denoted FIF_{max}. Unless otherwise specified, volume qualifiers indicate the volume inspired from RV at the point of measurement.)
- PEF: Peak expiratory flow: The highest forced expiratory flow measured with a peak flow meter
- MVV: Maximal voluntary ventilation: volume of air expired in a specified period during repetitive maximal effort

The FEV1/FVC ratio, also called modified Tiffeneau-Pinelli index, is a calculated ratio used in the diagnosis of obstructive and restrictive lung disease. It represents the proportion of a person's vital capacity that they are able to expire in the first second of forced expiration (FEV1) to the full, forced vital capacity (FVC). FEV1/FVC ratio was first proposed by E.A. Haensler in 1950. The FEV1/FVC index should not be confused with the FEV1/VC index (Tiffeneau-Pinelli index) as they are different, although both are intended for diagnosing airway obstruction. Current recommendations for diagnosing pulmonary function recommend using the modified Tiffeneau-Pinelli index (also known as the Haensler index). This index is recommended to be represented as a decimal fraction with two digits after the decimal point (for example, 0.70).

Normal values are approximately 75%. Predicted normal values can be calculated online and depend on age, sex, height, and ethnicity as well as the research study that they are based upon.

A derived value of FEV1% is FEV1% predicted, which is defined as FEV1% of the patient divided by the average FEV1% in the population for any person of similar age, sex, and body composition.

== Disease states ==
In obstructive lung disease, the FEV1 is reduced due to an obstruction of air escaping from the lungs. Thus, the FEV1/FVC ratio will be reduced. More specifically, according to the National Institute for Clinical Excellence, the diagnosis of COPD is made when the FEV_{1}/FVC ratio is less than 0.7 or the FEV_{1} is less than 75% of predicted; however, other authoritative bodies have different diagnostic cutoff points. The Global Initiative for Chronic Obstructive Lung Disease criteria also require that values are after bronchodilator medication has been given to make the diagnosis. According to the European Respiratory Society (ERS) criteria, it is FEV1% predicted that defines when a patient has COPD—that is, when the patient's FEV1% is less than 88% of the predicted value for men, or less than 89% for women.

In restrictive lung disease, the FEV1 and FVC are equally reduced due to fibrosis or other lung pathology (not obstructive pathology). Thus, the FEV1/FVC ratio should be approximately normal, or even increased due to a decrease in magnitude of FVC as compared to FEV1 (because of the decreased compliance associated with the presence of fibrosis in some pathological conditions).
