= Nitinol biocompatibility =

Nitinol biocompatibility is an important factor in biomedical applications. Nitinol (NiTi), which is formed by alloying nickel and titanium (~ 50% Ni), is a shape-memory alloy with superelastic properties more similar to that of bone, when compared to stainless steel, another commonly used biomaterial. Biomedical applications that utilize nitinol include stents, heart valve tools, bone anchors, staples, septal defect devices and implants. It is a commonly used biomaterial especially in the development of stent technology.

Metal implants containing a combination of biocompatible metals or used in conjunction with other biomaterials are often considered the standard for many implant types. Passivation is a process that removes corrosive implant elements from the implant-body interface and creates an oxide layer on the surface of the implant. The process is important for making biomaterials more biocompatible.

== Overview of common passivation methods ==
When materials are introduced to the body it is important not only that the material does not damage the body, but also that the environment of the body does not damage the implant. One method that prevents the negative effects resulting from this interaction is called passivation.

In general, passivation is considered to be a process that creates a non-reactive layer at the surface of materials, such that the material may be protected from damage caused by the environment. Passivation can be accomplished through many mechanisms. Passive layers can be made through the assembly of monolayers through polymer grafting. Often, for corrosion protection, passive layers are created through the formation of oxide or nitride layers at the surface.

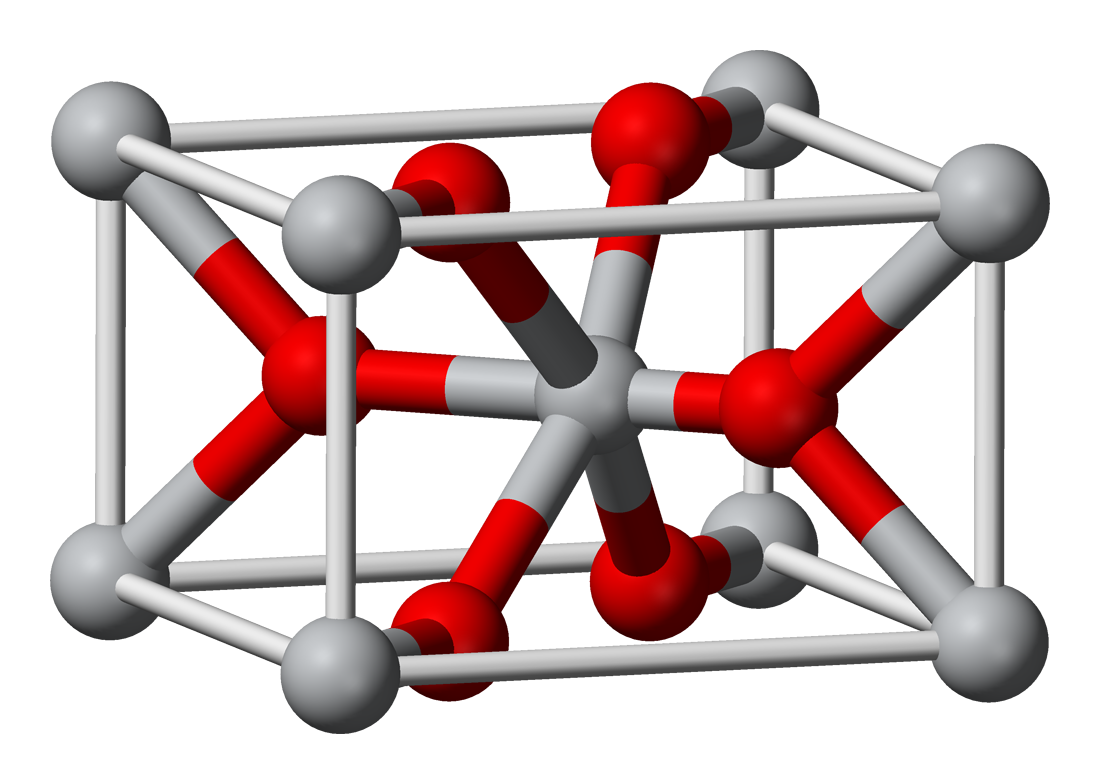
TiO_{2} Unit Cell Structure

=== Oxide films ===
Passivation often occurs naturally in some metals like titanium, a metal that often forms an oxide layer mostly composed of TiO_{2}. This process occurs spontaneously as the enthalpy of formation of TiO_{2} is negative. In alloys, such as nitinol, the formation of an oxide layer not only protects against corrosion, but also removes Ni atoms from the surface of the material. Removing certain elements from the surface of materials is another form of passivation. In nitinol, the removal of Ni is important, because Ni is toxic if leached into the body. Stainless steel is commonly passivated by the removal of iron from the surface through the use of acids and heat. Nitric acid is commonly used as a mild oxidant to create the thin oxide film on the surface of materials that protects against corrosion.

=== Electropolishing ===
Another mode of passivation involves polishing. Mechanical polishing removes many surface impurities and crystal structure breaks that may promote corrosion. Electropolishing is even more effective, because it doesn’t leave the scratches that mechanical polishing will. Electropolishing is accomplished by creating electrochemical cells where the material of interest is used as the anode. The surface will have jagged qualities where certain points are higher than others. In this cell the current density will be higher at the higher points and cause those points dissolve at a higher rate than the lower points, thus smoothing the surface. Crystal lattice point impurities will also be removed as the current will force these high-energy impurities to dissolve from the surface.

=== Coatings ===
Another commonly used method of passivation is accomplished through coating the material with polymer layers. Layers composed of polyurethane have been used to improve biocompatibility, but have seen limited success. Coating materials with biologically similar molecules has seen much better success. For example, phosphorylcholine surface modified stents have exhibited reduced thrombogenic activity. Passivation is an extremely important area of research for biomedical applications, as the body is a harsh environment for materials and materials can damage the body through leaching and corrosion. All of the above passivation methods have been used in the development of nitinol biomaterials to produce the most biocompatible implants.

== Influence of surface passivation on biocompatibility ==
Surface passivation techniques can greatly increase the corrosion resistance of nitinol. In order for nitinol to have the desired superelastic and shape memory properties, heat treatment is required. After heat treatment, the surface oxide layer contains a larger concentration of nickel in the form of NiO_{2} and NiO. This increase in nickel has been attributed to the diffusion of nickel out of the bulk material and into the surface layer during elevated temperature treatments. Surface characterization methods have shown that some surface passivation treatments decrease the concentration of NiO_{2} and NiO within the surface layer, leaving a higher concentration of the more stable TiO_{2} than in raw, heat-treated nitinol.

The decrease in nickel concentration in the surface layer of nitinol is correlated with a greater corrosion resistance. A potentiodynamic test is commonly employed to measure a material’s resistance to corrosion. This test determines the electrical potential at which a material begins to corrode. The measurement is called the pitting or breakdown potential. After passivation in a nitric acid solution, nitinol stent components showed significantly higher breakdown potentials than those that were unpassivated. In fact, there are many surface treatments that can greatly enhance the breakdown potentials of nitinol. These treatments include mechanical polishing, electropolishing, and chemical treatments such as, Nitric Oxide submersion, etching of the raw surface oxide layer, and pickling to break down bulk material near the surface.

Thrombogenicity, a material’s tendency to induce clot formation, is an important factor that determines the biocompatibility of any biomaterial that comes into contact with the bloodstream. There are two proteins, fibrinogen and albumin, that first adsorb to the surface of a foreign object in contact with blood. It has been suggested that fibrinogen may cause platelet activation due to a breakdown of the protein structure as it interacts with high energy grain boundaries on certain surfaces. Albumin on the other hand, inhibits platelet activation. This implies that there are two mechanisms which can help lower thrombogenicity, an amorphous surface layer where there will be no grain boundary interactions with fibrinogen, and a surface with a higher affinity to albumin than fibrinogen.

Just as thrombogenicity is important in determining suitability of other biomaterials, it is equally important with nitinol as a stent material. Currently, when stents are implanted, the patient receives antiaggregant therapy for a year or more in order to prevent the formation of a clot near the stent. By the time the drug therapy has ceased, ideally, a layer of endothelial cells, which line the inside of blood vessels would coat the outside of the stent. The stent is effectively integrated into the surrounding tissue and no longer in direct contact with the blood. There have been many attempts made using surface treatments to create stents that are more biocompatible and less thrombogenic, in an attempt to reduce the need for extensive antiplatelet therapy. Surface layers that are higher in nickel concentration cause less clotting due to albumin’s affinity to nickel. This is opposite of the surface layer characteristics that increase corrosion resistance. In vitro tests use indicators of thrombosis, such as platelet, Tyrosine aminotransferase, and β-TG levels. Surface treatments that have to some extent, lowered thrombogenicity in vitro are:

- Electropolishing
- Sandblasting
- Polyurethane coatings
- Aluminum coatings

Another area of research involves binding various pharmaceutical agents such as heparin to the surface of the stent. These drug-eluting stents show promise in further reducing thrombogenicity while not compromising corrosion resistance.

=== Welding ===
New advances with micro laser welding have vastly improved the quality of medical devices made with nitinol.

== Remarks ==
Nitinol is an important alloy for use in medical devices, due to its exceptional biocompatibility, especially in the areas of corrosion resistance and thrombogenicity. Corrosion resistance is enhanced through methods that produce a uniform titanium dioxide layer on the surface with very few defects and impurities. Thrombogenicity is lowered on nitinol surfaces that contain nickel, so processes that retain nickel oxides in the surface layer are beneficial. The use of coatings has also been shown to greatly improve biocompatibility.

Because implanted devices contact the surface of the material, surface science plays an integral role in research aimed at enhancing biocompatibility, and in the development of new biomaterials. The development and improvement of nitinol as an implant material, from characterizing and improving the oxide layer to developing coatings, has been based largely on surface science.

Research is underway to produce better, more biocompatible, coatings. This research involves producing a coating that is very much like biologic material in order to further lessen the foreign body reaction. Biocomposite coatings containing cells or protein coatings are being explored for use with nitinol as well as many other biomaterials.

== Current research/further reading ==
- The U.S. Food and Drug Administration lists recently approved stent technology on their Heart Health Online site.
- Angioplasty.org contains information on current stent research, as well as other issues relating to the circulatory system. Including:
  - Drug-eluting Stents
  - Current developments in stent technology.
  - Advancements in circulatory imaging technology.
- Use of biocomposites for medical applications:
  - Orthopaedic
  - Dental
- ISO and FDA set standards for evaluating and determining biocompatibility. ISO 10993 Standards-"Biological Evaluation of Medical Devices"
