= Global Initiative for Chronic Obstructive Lung Disease =

Medical nonprofit organization

The Global Initiative for Chronic Obstructive Lung Disease (GOLD) is a non-profit organization started by the World Health Organization and the US National Heart, Lung, and Blood Institute in 1997 to improve care for chronic obstructive pulmonary disease (COPD). They have organized the annual awareness day, World Chronic Obstructive Pulmonary Disease Day (World COPD Day), every November since 2002.

This organization issues recommendations for the treatment of chronic obstructive pulmonary disease and related medical conditions. GOLD issued its first formal recommendations in 2001. Their approach departed from previous medical guidelines in two significant respects:

- Previous recommendations were usually written by groups of experts, usually from a single medical specialty, partly on the basis of their own experiences. They were the first to evaluate the levels of evidence that supported their recommendations. GOLD's approach to evidence-based medicine was more rigorous than the previous COPD recommendations, but other organizations, including the National Institute for Health and Care Excellence, use more complex systems.
- GOLD's recommendations are also updated more frequently than was typical in the past. This allows the recommendations to include newer evidence.

== Adoption ==
The GOLD grading system for classifying the severity of COPD is widely used worldwide.
