= Breath-based cancer detection =

Cancer screening approach using exhaled breath analysis

Breath-based cancer detection is an approach to cancer screening that uses the analysis of volatile organic compounds (VOCs) in exhaled breath to identify the presence of malignant tumors. Cancer cells alter the body's normal metabolic processes, producing distinctive VOC patterns that can be detected in breath samples collected non-invasively. Research into this field began in the 1980s and has expanded significantly with advances in analytical chemistry, machine learning, and the use of trained animals as detection platforms.

Unlike conventional screening methods such as mammography, colonoscopy, or low-dose computed tomography, breath-based cancer detection does not require imaging equipment, blood draws, or physical preparation. This has made it an area of active clinical investigation as a potential first-pass screening tool for early-stage cancer detection in asymptomatic individuals.

== Background ==
Volatile organic compounds are carbon-based chemicals that vaporize at room temperature and are present in human exhaled breath at trace concentrations, typically in the range of parts per billion to parts per trillion. Healthy individuals exhale a baseline mixture of VOCs arising from normal cellular metabolism. In cancer patients, this profile changes.

Cancer cells exhibit altered metabolic activity, including increased oxidative stress and disrupted cellular respiration, which produces byproduct VOCs not present in healthy tissue at the same concentrations. These compounds enter the bloodstream through the lung capillary network and are subsequently exhaled, creating a detectable molecular signature in breath samples. Specific VOC classes associated with cancer-related metabolic changes include alkanes, benzene derivatives, and aldehydes, and more than 2,000 VOCs have been identified across different body fluids.

The first reported clinical observation suggesting that cancer produces a detectable odor signature occurred in 1989, when a published case report described a dog repeatedly investigating a melanoma lesion on its owner's skin, prompting a diagnosis.

== Detection methods ==
=== Analytical chemistry approaches ===
The earliest systematic approaches to breath VOC analysis used laboratory-based techniques including gas chromatography–mass spectrometry (GC-MS), which separates and identifies individual VOC compounds with high precision. GC-MS has been used to characterize VOC profiles associated with lung cancer and other malignancies. Limitations of GC-MS include the requirement for specialized laboratory equipment, lengthy sample processing times, and the need for trained operators.

Subsequent detection technologies have included ion mobility spectrometry, proton transfer reaction mass spectrometry, and colorimetric sensor arrays. These approaches aim to identify VOC patterns rather than individual compounds, enabling faster and less equipment-intensive analysis.

=== Electronic nose devices ===
Electronic nose (e-nose) technology uses arrays of chemical sensors to detect broad VOC patterns in exhaled breath, mimicking the function of biological olfactory systems. A multicenter validation study published in CHEST enrolled 575 subjects and demonstrated that exhaled breath patterns could adequately distinguish patients with non-small cell lung cancer from controls, with sensitivity of 95% and a negative predictive value of 94% when breath data was combined with clinical variables. A systematic review and meta-analysis of 52 studies covering 3,677 individuals found pooled sensitivity of 90% and specificity of 87% for e-nose cancer detection, though the authors noted that most studies were feasibility studies with small sample sizes, high heterogeneity, and a lack of standardization. Challenges include susceptibility to environmental confounders and the difficulty of achieving reproducible sensor responses across clinical settings.

=== Canine detection ===
Dogs possess substantially more olfactory receptors than humans — up to 220 to 300 million compared to approximately 5 to 6 million in humans — and can detect odors at concentrations of parts per trillion. These anatomical and physiological characteristics underlie the exceptional scent detection capability that has made trained dogs subjects of interest in VOC-based cancer detection research. Beginning with formal studies in the early 2000s, researchers established that trained dogs could identify cancer-associated VOC profiles in breath, urine, and tissue samples with clinically meaningful accuracy.

A 2006 study published in Integrative Cancer Therapies by McCulloch et al. demonstrated that trained dogs could detect lung cancer in breath samples with sensitivity of 99% and specificity of 99%, and breast cancer with sensitivity of 88% and specificity of 98%. Subsequent studies extended these findings to colorectal, prostate, and ovarian cancers.

Buszewski et al. (2012) found that trained dogs could differentiate between breath samples of individuals diagnosed with lung cancer and non-cancer controls, achieving sensitivity and specificity of 82% each, with a positive correlation observed between dog indications and the presence of specific exhaled compounds.

Horvath et al. (2013) demonstrated that trained dogs could detect clinical recurrence of ovarian cancer in 42 women treated with chemotherapy, achieving sensitivity of 97% and specificity of 99%.

A 2017 study by Guerrero-Flores et al. reported that a trained beagle could identify cervical cancer-specific VOCs in cervical smear and adsorbent material samples with sensitivity and specificity above 90%, using a double-blind procedure.

Feil et al. (2021) evaluated a trained dog's ability to detect lung cancer using breath and urine samples combined, with an overall detection rate of 97.6% (95% CI 87.1–99.9%). Using breath samples alone, the detection rate was 78%.

Ortal et al. (2022) published a proof-of-concept study in Scientific Reports demonstrating that a trained dog could detect osteosarcoma-specific VOC profiles in cancer cell lines with sensitivity and specificity between 95% and 100%, and could also discriminate osteosarcoma saliva samples from two patients from healthy controls. The authors noted the findings require validation in larger patient cohorts.

A significant methodological limitation across canine detection studies is the absence of standardized protocols for breath collection, sample handling, dog training, and result interpretation, which makes cross-study comparisons difficult.

=== Bio-AI hybrid platforms ===
More recent research has combined canine olfactory detection with artificial intelligence to address the consistency and scalability limitations of earlier approaches. These bio-AI hybrid platforms use sensor arrays to capture the behavioral and physiological responses of trained detection dogs in real time as they evaluate breath samples. Machine learning algorithms then process these signals to generate a standardized, reproducible output, reducing the dependency on individual handler interpretation.

In 2024, a prospective double-blind clinical study published in Scientific Reports (Nature Portfolio) evaluated one such platform developed by SpotitEarly, a US-based biotech company. The study enrolled 1,386 participants and assessed the platform's ability to detect cancer in exhaled breath samples collected at home. The system demonstrated a sensitivity of 93.9% (95% CI 90.3–96.2%) and specificity of 94.3% (95% CI 92.7–95.5%) across breast, lung, prostate, and colorectal cancer, including at early disease stages.

== Clinical evidence by cancer type ==
=== Lung cancer ===
Lung cancer has been the most extensively studied cancer type in breath VOC research, partly due to the biological plausibility of detecting pulmonary malignancies in exhaled air. A 2012 study published in the European Respiratory Journal identified lung cancer in breath samples with a sensitivity of 71% and specificity of 93% using canine detection. Multiple subsequent studies using both canine detection and e-nose technology have reported sensitivity and specificity values above 90% in controlled settings.

=== Breast cancer ===
Studies using trained dogs to evaluate breath samples from breast cancer patients have reported sensitivities between 80% and 95% and specificities above 90%. A 2023 study by Liu et al. published in the Journal of Hematology and Oncology used high-throughput breathomics analysis to identify VOC markers distinguishing breast cancer patients from healthy controls in a cohort of over 5,000 women, reporting detection rates of 85% to 97% across disease stages. No universally validated panel of breast cancer breath biomarkers has yet been established.

=== Colorectal cancer ===
A 2011 study by Sonoda et al. published in Gut demonstrated that a trained dog could detect colorectal cancer from breath samples with a sensitivity of 91% and specificity of 99%, performance comparable to established colonoscopic diagnosis. Non-colonoscopic colorectal screening modalities with regulatory approval and clinical use include stool-based tests such as the fecal immunochemical test and stool DNA tests such as Cologuard.

=== Prostate cancer ===
Multiple studies have evaluated canine detection of prostate cancer in urine samples, with several reporting sensitivities and specificities above 90%. Breath-based detection of prostate cancer has received less research attention than urine-based approaches.

== Standardization and challenges ==
A recurring theme in breath-based cancer detection research is the difficulty of standardizing protocols across studies. Key variables that affect breath VOC profiles include diet, medication use, environmental exposures, smoking history, time of sample collection, and breath collection technique. The absence of validated reference standards for many cancer-associated VOCs has made it difficult to compare results across laboratories and clinical settings.

A 2015 systematic review identified 73 breath analysis studies for cancer detection and found that while many achieved strong diagnostic performance, one in four studies lacked appropriate statistical correction for overfitting, raising concerns about reported accuracy figures in smaller trials.

Regulatory approval for breath-based cancer detection as a clinical screening tool has not been granted by major health authorities including the US Food and Drug Administration as of 2026. Platforms operating in the United States may pursue CLIA certification, which governs laboratory testing standards, as a pathway toward clinical use.

== Current research and platforms ==
Several companies and research groups are pursuing breath-based cancer detection as a commercial or clinical product. SpotitEarly, a US-based biotech company, has developed the LUCID bio-AI hybrid platform for multi-cancer screening using trained detection canines and machine learning, with clinical validation published in Scientific Reports in 2024.

Owlstone Medical, a UK-based company, is developing breath biopsy technology using exogenous VOC probes for lung cancer detection and other conditions.

== See also ==
- Canine cancer detection
- Breath gas analysis
- Volatile organic compound
- Cancer screening
- Liquid biopsy
