= RV Marcelle Melosira =

American university research vessel

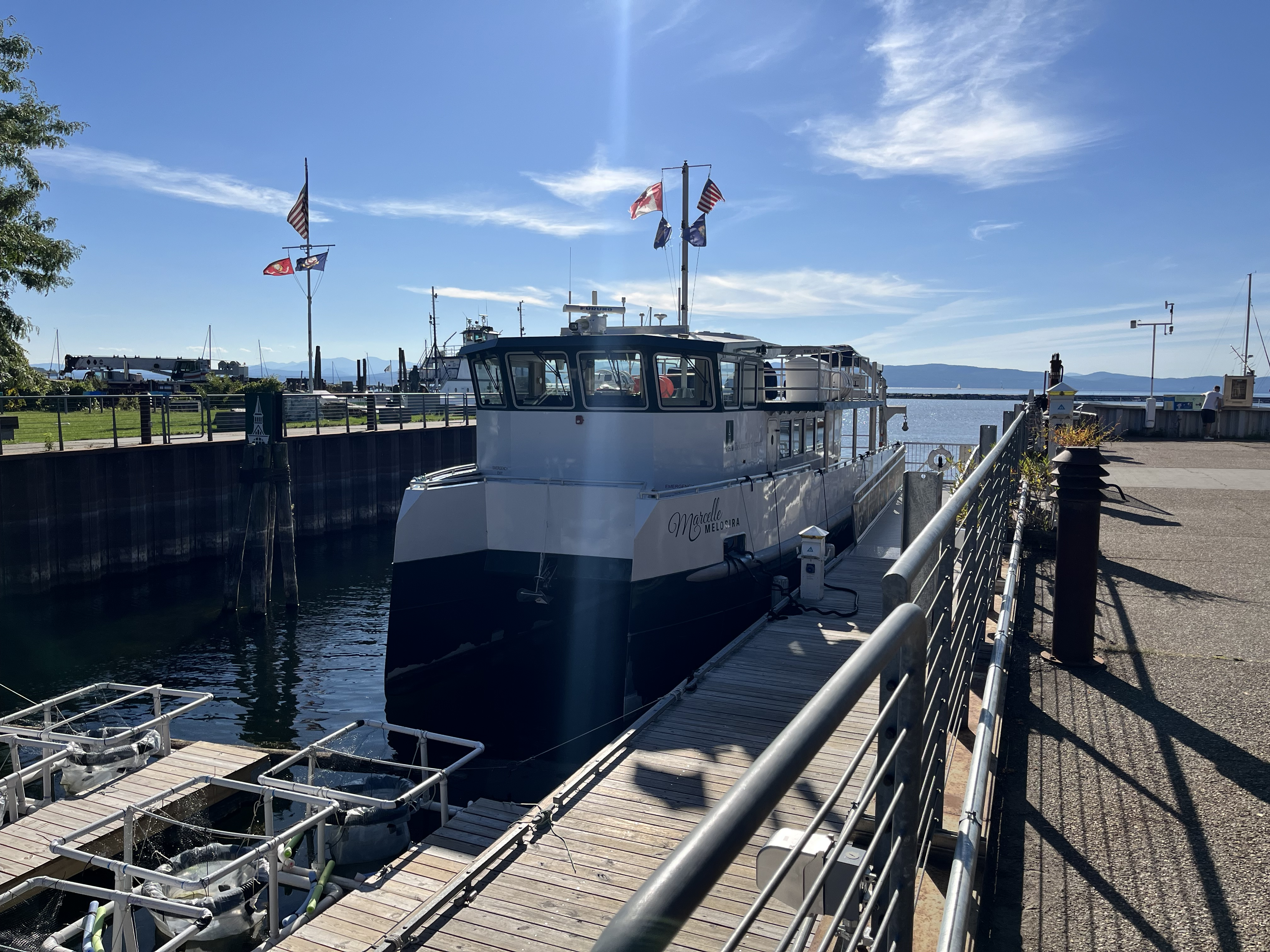
- RV Marcelle Melosira docked next to the ECHO, Leahy Center for Lake Champlain on September 12, 2025.

History

United States
- Name: Marcelle Melosira
- Operator: Rubenstein School of Environment and Natural Sciences
- Builder: Derecktor Shipyards
- Acquired: 2023
- Home port: Burlington, Vermont
- Identification: MMSI number: 368279110
- Status: In service

General characteristics
- Type: Research vessel
- Length: 19 m (62 ft 4 in)
- Beam: 6 m (19 ft 8 in)
- Propulsion: BAE Systems HybriGen system propulsion package
- Capacity: 32
- Crew: 3

RV Marcelle Melosira is a hybrid-electric catamaran research vessel and floating classroom owned and operated by the University of Vermont's Rubenstein School of Environment and Natural Resources (RSENR). She was delivered in 2023 to supersede RSENR's previous research vessel, RV Melosira. She sails under the United States flag on Lake Champlain in Vermont and New York. She is used often by RSENR for research, class labs, and other activities sanctioned by the university. When not in use, she can be found docked in front of the ECHO, Leahy Center for Lake Champlain.

== Construction and Nomenclature ==
=== Nomenclature ===
Marcelle Melosira is named for Marcelle Leahy, wife of former Vermont senator Patrick Leahy, and for the Melosira, RSENR's previous flagship research vessel, named for a type of diatom.

RSENR's previous research vessel, the RV Melosira.

=== Construction ===
Marcelle Melosira is designed by Chartwell Marine. She began construction in October 2020. She was constructed at Derecktor Shipyards in Mamaroneck, New York and was delivered in 2023. The Marcelle Melosira is a hybrid-electric catamaran that features a BAE Systems hybrid drive, with up to 3 hours of pure electric run time, and a projected 60% reduction in fuel burnt from the previous flagship research vessel.

== Features ==
=== Features ===
Marcelle Melosira sports a number of scientific tools, including:

- Sonar technology
- Fish & Plankton Sampler
- Profiler for studying large particles & plankton
- Echoview software to process hydroacoustic data
- Gas analyzer
- Corer for sampling sediment
