= Water jacket =

Water-filled casing surrounding a device for temperature control

A water jacket is a water-filled casing surrounding a device, typically a metal sheath having intake and outlet vents to allow water to be pumped through and circulated. The flow of water to an external heating or cooling device allows precise temperature control of the device.

== Applications ==
Water jackets are often used for water cooling or heating. They are also used in laboratory glassware: Liebig, Graham, and Allihn condensers. Water jackets were used to cool the barrels of machine guns until several years after the First World War, but modern machine guns are air-cooled to conserve weight and hence increase portability.

In a reciprocating piston internal combustion engine, the water jacket is a series of holes either cast or bored through the main engine block and connected by inlet and outlet valves to a radiator.

Equipment such as tissue culture incubators may be enclosed in a water jacket kept at a constant temperature.

A water jacket is used in an Orsat analyzer to prevent any change in temperature from affecting the density of the gas being analyzed.

The concept gives its name to the water jacket furnace, a type of blast furnace, using a cold air blast, that was used for the smelting of non-ferrous metallic mineral ores. These furnaces are cooled by a water jacket arrangement. The terminology is also used for an indirect heating device used in the petroleum oil and gas industry, generally known as a water jacket heater or water bath heater.

== See also ==
- Jacketed vessel
- Sous vide – a cooking method which utilizes the same principle for precise temperature control
