= Enzyme immunoassay =

An enzyme immunoassay is any of several immunoassay methods that use an enzyme bound to an antigen or antibody. These may include:

- Enzyme-linked immunosorbent assay (ELISA)
- Enzyme multiplied immunoassay technique (EMIT)
- Fluorescent enzyme immunoassays (FEIAs)
- Chemiluminescent immunoassays (CLIAs)
- Radioimmunoassays (RIAs)
