= Breath test =

Tests done on air exhaled from lungs

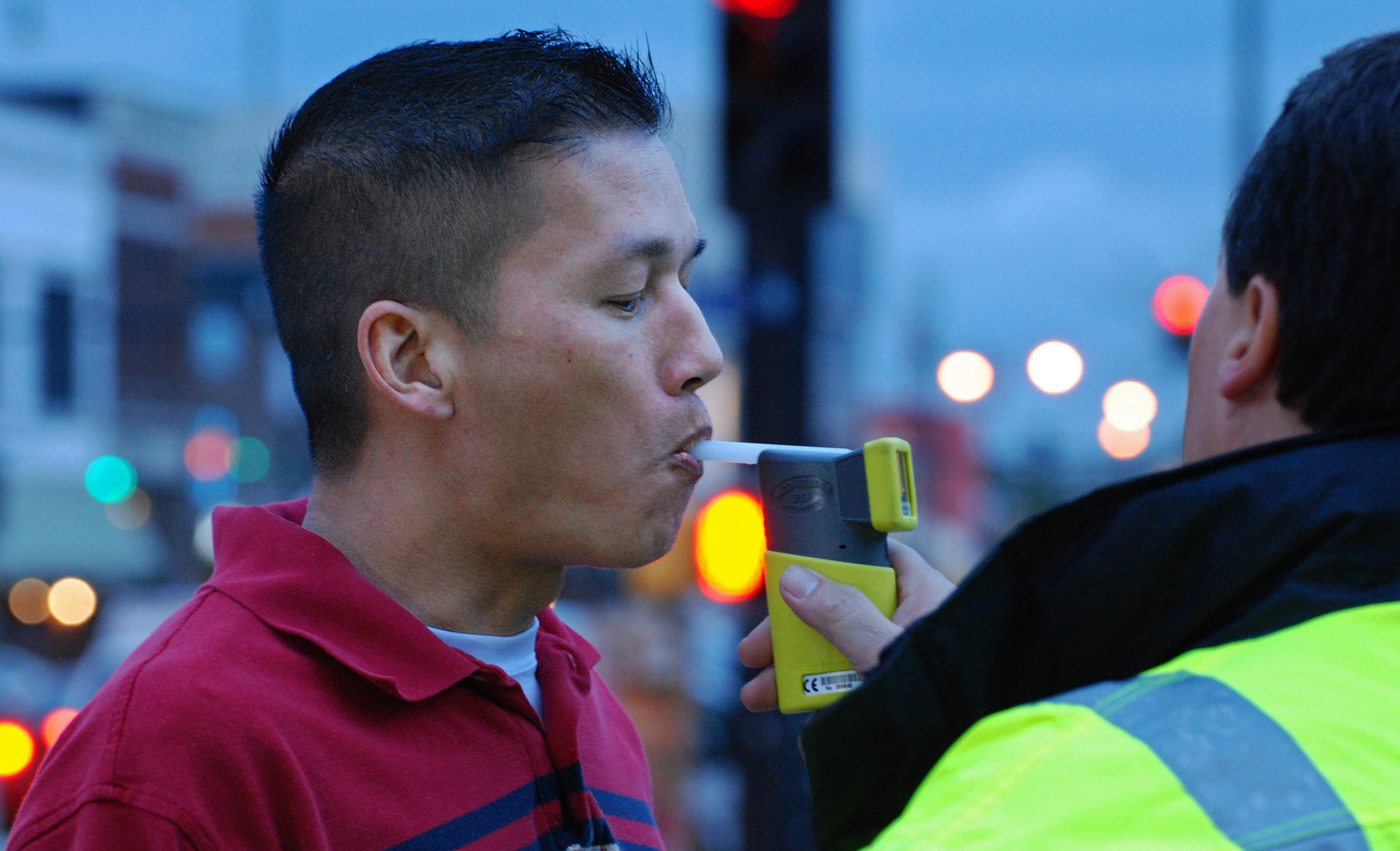
- A person taking a Breathalyser test
- MeSH: D001944

A breath test is a type of test performed on air generated from the act of exhalation.

Types include:

- Breathalyzer – by far the most common usage of this term relates to the legal breath test to determine if a person is driving under the influence of alcohol.
- Hydrogen breath test – it is becoming increasingly common for people to undertake a medical test for clinical diagnosis of dietary disabilities such as fructose intolerance, fructose malabsorption, lactose intolerance and lactulose intolerance.
- The presence of Helicobacter pylori (in peptic ulcer disease) can be tested for with the urea breath test.
- Exhaled nitric oxide is a breath test that might signal airway inflammation such as in asthma.
- Breath tests for diseases have been developed for early detection of lung cancer, breast cancer, pulmonary tuberculosis and many others, to serve as an adjunct to existing medical tests. A trial will commence at Addenbrooke's Hospital in Cambridge, England to confirm the efficacy of these breath tests. Phase II and Phase III clinical studies by Menssana Research, Inc. in the United States are also under way.

== See also ==
- Breath diagnostics
- Breath gas analysis
