= Pool chlorine hypothesis =

The pool chlorine hypothesis is the hypothesis that long-term attendance at indoor chlorinated swimming pools by children up to the age of about 6–7 years is a major factor in the rise of asthma in rich countries since the late twentieth century. A narrower version of the hypothesis, i.e. that asthma may be induced by chlorine related compounds from swimming pools, has been stated based on a small numbers of cases at least as early as 1995. An empirically motivated statement of the wider form of the hypothesis is first known to have been published on the basis of tests of the effects of nitrogen trichloride above chlorinated water on the lung as well as epidemiological evidence by a group of medical researchers led by Alfred Bernard of the Department of Public Health in the Catholic University of Louvain in Brussels, Belgium in 2003. In the epidemiological studies, the association between chlorinated swimming pools and asthma was found to be more significant than factors such as age, sex, ethnic origin, socioeconomic status, exposure to domestic animals and passive smoking (in a study in Brussels), and independent of altitude, climate, and GDP per capita (in a Europe-wide study of 21 countries).

== Effects of nitrogen trichloride (trichloramine) on the human lung ==
Nitrogen trichloride has been directly linked as a factor causing asthma in two lifeguards and a swimming teacher. A study of 624 swimming pool workers found a significant correlation between upper respiratory symptoms and their total exposure to nitrogen trichloride. The study also found an excess risk in the workers for the specific symptoms indicative of asthma. In a study by Alfred Bernard's group, two hours exposure to an average concentration of 0.490 mg/m^{3} of nitrogen trichloride above a swimming pool was found in both children and adults to significantly increase the levels of the alveolar surfactant associated proteins A and B, which indicate hyperpermeability of lung epithelium. In other words, exposure to nitrogen trichloride was found to weaken the protective nature of the surface of the lungs.

== Epidemiological studies ==
In a study of 341 schoolchildren, Bernard and his colleagues found that long-term attendance at indoor chlorinated swimming pools by the children up to the age of about 6–7 years was a strong predictor of airway inflammation (measured by exhaled nitric oxide) independently of other factors, while for those children susceptible to allergic problems, as defined by having a blood serum level of immunoglobulin E greater than 100 kIU/L, their total time spent at indoor chlorinated swimming pools was a strong predictor of the probability that they would have asthma.

=== Relations to demographic and environmental variables ===
In the Bernard group's study of 226 children in Brussels and the Ardenne region in 2003, asthma and exercise-induced bronchoconstriction (a test related to potential breathing difficulties) were not found to have any statistically significant correlation with the demographic and environmental factors of age, sex, ethnic origin, socioeconomic status or exposure to pets or passive smoking alone. However, when the time spent at chlorinated swimming pools (modified for pool height as a statistical way to indicate likely concentrations of chlorine related gases) was adjusted for exposure to pets and passive smoking, the significance of the correlations with asthma increased further. The authors describe this saying that a "very strong argument in [favour] of causality [between pool attendance and asthma] comes from the synergistic action of exposure to pets and [passive smoking], two well documented risk factors for asthma, which together considerably increase the strength of the associations, to levels largely above those usually observed in asthma epidemiology."

In a later study by the Bernard group of 190,000 children in 21 countries in Europe, it was found that 13- to 14-year-old children were 2% to 3.5% more likely to have or have had asthma for every additional indoor chlorinated pool per 100,000 inhabitants in their place of residence. Other atopic diseases such as hay fever or atopic dermatitis were found to be not associated with the presence of the pools. The association of asthma with the number of indoor chlorinated swimming pools per 100,000 inhabitants was found by the authors to be independent of altitude, climate, and GDP per capita.

=== Scientific debate on the epidemiological studies ===
After the publication of Bernard's group's 2003 study, B. Armstrong and D. Strachan described the study as "generally well conducted", but stated that some aspects of the statistical analysis and interpretation were "misleading", to the extent that "the epidemiological association of asthma with swimming pool use [was] not as strong as claimed by the authors".

Following publication of Bernard's group's 2006 study, some concerns by P. A. Eggleston and a response by Bernard's group were published. For example, Eggleston argued that if "chlorinated compounds at indoor swimming pools could cause asthma", then "frequent and longer exposures at home" should be even stronger causes of asthma, in contradiction to the available evidence from a single group of children. Bernard's group's response was that while children at an indoor chlorinated pool "actively inhale [the chlorination products] as gases, aerosols, or even water", they are not usually involved in household cleaning tasks, so they could benefit from the hygienic effects of the chlorine based cleaning products while avoiding any significant contact with the related gases. Members of Bernard's group's declared that they had no potentially conflicting financial interests, while Eggleston declared that he had received money from the United States-based group called the Chlorine Chemistry Council. In a "Faculty Disclosure" statement in an asthma-related publication, it was declared that Eggleston is "a consultant for Chlorine Chemistry Council, Church and Dwight, Merck Sharp & Dohme, and Procter & Gamble, and is on the speakers' bureau for AstraZeneca, GlaxoSmithKline, and Merck."

== Hypothesised mechanistic explanation ==
Alfred Bernard and colleagues argue that what is common to the pool chlorine hypothesis and epidemiological studies associating chlorine based irritants to atopy could be that frequent, long-term disruption of the epithelium of the lung, which normally provides a protective barrier against various pathogens, could allow allergens to cross this barrier. This process would also cause certain proteins from the lung epithelium to have increased blood serum concentrations.

== See also ==
- Hygiene hypothesis
