= Breath diagnostics =

- Purpose: analysis of breath to detect diseases

Breath diagnostics involves the analysis of a sample of human breath to monitor, diagnose, and detect diseases and conditions. Exhaled human breath contains nitrogen, oxygen, carbon dioxide, water vapour and over one thousand other compounds at trace levels that can serve as biomarkers.

Breath analysis for the identification of biomarkers and development of diagnostic breath tests based on them is an area of active research. Many of these species are formed as the by-products of metabolic processes and can be indicative of a number of different diseases and conditions.

Currently three breath-based tests have received regulatory clearance or approval from the U.S. Food and Drug Administration (FDA) for clinical use.

== Fractional exhaled nitric oxide (FeNO) ==
Fractional exhaled nitric oxide (FeNO) measurement quantifies nitric oxide in exhaled breath as a marker of eosinophilic airway inflammation. It is used as an adjunct to clinical and laboratory assessments in the evaluation and management of asthma and other inflammatory airway conditions, particularly to monitor response to anti-inflammatory therapy.

Multiple devices have received FDA 510(k) clearance under product code MXA (breath nitric oxide test system). The first was the NIOX system (Aerocrine, later Circassia), cleared in 2003. Subsequent cleared devices include NIOX MINO, NIOX VERO, and others such as Fenom Flo™ and NObreath®. Testing is typically performed by having the patient inhale nitric oxide-free air to total lung capacity and then exhale steadily into the device.

== Urea breath test ==
The urea breath test (UBT) is a non-invasive tracer stable isotope ratio method for detecting active Helicobacter pylori infection in the stomach. The patient ingests a solution containing ¹³C-labelled urea. If H. pylori is present, its urease enzyme hydrolyses the urea, producing ¹³CO₂ that is absorbed into the blood and exhaled. An increase in the ¹³CO₂/¹²CO₂ ratio in breath samples indicates infection.

Several systems have FDA clearance or approval for initial diagnosis and post-treatment monitoring in adults and (in some cases) paediatric patients aged 3–17 years. Examples include BreathTek UBT and BreathID systems. The test is widely recommended in clinical guidelines as a preferred non-invasive option.

== Heartsbreath test (cardiac markers) ==
The Heartsbreath test (Menssana Research) analyses volatile organic compounds (primarily alkanes) in breath as markers of oxidative stress. It received FDA Humanitarian Device Exemption (HDE) approval in 2004 for use as an aid in the diagnosis of grade 3 heart transplant rejection in patients who received a heart transplant within the preceding year. It is intended only as an adjunct to, and not a substitute for, endomyocardial biopsy, and is limited to patients who have undergone biopsy within the prior month.

Medicare has determined the test is not reasonable and necessary for coverage.

== Other breath analysis methods ==
Beyond these regulated tests, research continues into broader analysis of volatile organic compounds and breath aerosols for potential diagnostic applications. For more detailed coverage of analytical techniques, biomarkers, and research directions, see Breath gas analysis and Breath analysis.
