= Liver function tests =

Blood tests indicating the state of the liver

S.G.O.T. (ALT), S.G.P.T. (AST)
- ICD-10-PCS: K-70 to K-77
- ICD-9-CM: 570–573
- MeSH: D008111
- MedlinePlus: 003436

Liver function tests (LFTs or LFs), also referred to as a hepatic panel or liver panel, are groups of blood tests that provide information about the state of a patient's liver. These tests include prothrombin time (PT/INR), activated partial thromboplastin time (aPTT), albumin, bilirubin (direct and indirect), and others. The liver transaminases aspartate transaminase (AST or SGOT) and alanine transaminase (ALT or SGPT) are useful biomarkers of liver injury in a patient with some degree of intact liver function.

Most liver diseases cause only mild symptoms initially, but these diseases must be detected early. Hepatic (liver) involvement in some diseases can be of crucial importance. This testing is performed on a patient's blood sample. Some tests are associated with functionality (e.g., albumin), some with cellular integrity (e.g., transaminase), and some with conditions linked to the biliary tract (gamma-glutamyl transferase and alkaline phosphatase). Because some of these tests do not measure function, it is more accurate to call these liver chemistries or liver tests rather than liver function tests.

Several biochemical tests are useful in the evaluation and management of patients with hepatic dysfunction. These tests can be used to detect the presence of liver disease. They can help distinguish among different types of liver disorders, gauge the extent of known liver damage, and monitor the response to treatment. Some or all of these measurements are also carried out (usually about twice a year for routine cases) on individuals taking certain medications, such as anticonvulsants, to ensure that these medications are not adversely impacting the person's liver.

== Standard liver panel ==
Standard liver tests for assessing liver damage include alanine aminotransferase (ALT), aspartate aminotransferase (AST), and alkaline phosphatase (ALP). Bilirubin may be used to estimate the excretory function of the liver and coagulation tests and albumin can be used to evaluate the metabolic activity of the liver.

Although example reference ranges are given, these will vary depending on method of analysis used at the administering laboratory, as well as age, gender, ethnicity, and potentially unrelated health factors. Individual results should always be interpreted using the reference range provided by the laboratory that performed the test.

=== Total bilirubin ===
Reference range in adults
Parameters/units	Total bilirubin	Unconjugated bilirubin	Conjugated bilirubin
mg/dL	0.1–1.0	0.2–0.7	0.1–0.4
μmol/L	2.0–21	< 12	< 8

Measurement of total bilirubin includes both unconjugated (indirect) and conjugated (direct) bilirubin. Unconjugated bilirubin is a breakdown product of heme (a part of hemoglobin in red blood cells). The liver is responsible for clearing the blood of unconjugated bilirubin, by 'conjugating' it (modified to make it water-soluble) through an enzyme named UDP-glucuronyl-transferase. When the total bilirubin level exceeds 17 μmol/L, it indicates liver disease. When total bilirubin levels exceed 40 μmol/L, bilirubin deposition at the sclera, skin, and mucous membranes will give these areas a yellow colour, thus it is called jaundice.

The increase in predominantly unconjugated bilirubin is due to overproduction, reduced hepatic uptake of the unconjugated bilirubin and reduced conjugation of bilirubin. Overproduction can be due to the reabsorption of a haematoma and ineffective erythropoiesis leading to increased red blood cell destruction. Gilbert's syndrome and Crigler–Najjar syndrome have defects in the UDP-glucuronyl-transferase enzyme, affecting bilirubin conjugation.

The degree of rise in conjugated bilirubin is directly proportional to the degree of hepatocyte injury. Viral hepatitis can also cause the rise in conjugated bilirubin. In parenchymal liver disease and incomplete extrahepatic obstruction, the rise in conjugated bilirubin is less than the complete common bile duct obstruction due to malignant causes. In Dubin–Johnson syndrome, a mutation in multiple drug-resistance protein 2 (MRP2) causes a rise in conjugated bilirubin.

In acute appendicitis, total bilirubin can rise from 20.52 μmol/L to 143 μmol/L. In pregnant women, the total bilirubin level is low in all three trimesters.

The measurement of bilirubin levels in the newborns is done through the use of bilimeter or transcutanoeus bilirubinometer instead of performing LFTs. When the total serum bilirubin increases over 95th percentile for age during the first week of life for high risk babies, it is known as hyperbilirubinemia of the newborn (neonatal jaundice) and requires light therapy to reduce the amount of bilirubin in the blood. Pathological jaundice in newborns should be suspected when the serum bilirubin level rises by more than 5 mg/dL per day, serum bilirubin more than the physiological range, clinical jaundice more than 2 weeks, and conjugated bilirubin (dark urine staining clothes). Haemolytic jaundice is the commonest cause of pathological jaundice. Those babies with Rh hemolytic disease, ABO incompatibility with the mother, Glucose-6-phosphate dehydrogenase (G-6-PD) deficiency and minor blood group incompatibility are at increased risk of getting haemolytic jaundice.

=== Alanine transaminase (ALT) ===
Reference range
7-56 IU/L

Apart from being found in high concentrations in the liver, ALT is found in the kidneys, heart, and muscles. It catalyses the transamination reaction, and only exists in a cytoplasmic form. Any kind of liver injury can cause a rise in ALT. A rise of up to 300 IU/L is not specific to the liver, but can be due to the damage of other organs such as the kidneys or muscles. When ALT rises to more than 500 IU/L, causes are usually from the liver. It can be due to hepatitis, ischemic liver injury, and toxins that causes liver damage. The ALT levels in hepatitis C rises more than in hepatitis A and B. Persistent ALT elevation more than 6 months is known as chronic hepatitis. Alcoholic liver disease, non-alcoholic fatty liver disease (NAFLD), fat accumulation in liver during childhood obesity, steatohepatitis (inflammation of fatty liver disease) are associated with a rise in ALT. Rise in ALT is also associated with reduced insulin response, reduced glucose tolerance, and increased free fatty acids and triglycerides. Bright liver syndrome (bright liver on ultrasound suggestive of fatty liver) with raised ALT is suggestive of metabolic syndrome.

In pregnancy, ALT levels would rise during the second trimester. In one of the studies, measured ALT levels in pregnancy-related conditions such as hyperemesis gravidarum was 103.5 IU/L, pre-eclampsia was 115, HELLP syndrome was 149. ALT levels would reduce by greater than 50% in three days after child delivery. Another study also shows that caffeine consumption can reduce the risk of ALT elevation in those who consume alcohol, overweight people, impaired glucose metabolism, and viral hepatitis.

=== Aspartate transaminase (AST) ===
Reference range
0-35 IU/L

AST exists in two isoenzymes namely mitochondrial form and cytoplasmic form. It is found in highest concentration in the liver, followed by heart, muscle, kidney, brain, pancreas, and lungs. This wide range of AST containing organs makes it a relatively less specific indicator of liver damage compared to ALT. An increase of mitochondrial AST in bloods is highly suggestive of tissue necrosis in myocardial infarction and chronic liver disease. More than 80% of the liver AST activity are contributed by mitochondrial form of the isoenzymes, while the circulating AST in blood are contributed by cytoplasmic form of AST. AST is especially markedly raised in those with liver cirrhosis. AST can be released from a variety of other tissues and if the elevation is less than two times the normal AST, no further workup needs to be performed if a patient is proceeding to surgery.

In certain pregnancy related conditions such as hyperemesis gravidarum, AST can reach as high as 73 IU/L, 66 IU/L in pre-eclampsia, and 81 IU/L in HELLP syndrome.

=== AST/ALT ratio ===
The AST/ALT ratio increases in liver functional impairment. In alcoholic liver disease, the mean ratio is 1.45, and mean ratio is 1.33 in post necrotic liver cirrhosis. Ratio is greater than 1.17 in viral cirrhosis, greater than 2.0 in alcoholic hepatitis, and 0.9 in non-alcoholic hepatitis. Ratio is greater than 4.5 in Wilson disease or hyperthyroidism.

=== Alkaline phosphatase (ALP) ===
Reference range
41 to 133 IU/L

Alkaline phosphatase (ALP) is an enzyme in the cells lining the biliary ducts of the liver. Elevated ALP often suggests biliary disease and warrants workup with ultrasound. It can also be found on the mucosal epithelium of the small intestine, proximal convoluted tubule of the kidneys, bone, liver, and placenta. It plays an important role in lipid transposition in small intestines and calcification of bones. 50% of all the serum ALP activities in blood are contributed by bone. Acute viral hepatitis usually has normal or increased ALP. For example, hepatitis A has increased ALP due to cholestasis (impaired bile formation or bile flow obstruction) and would have the feature of prolonged itching. Other causes include: infiltrative liver diseases, granulomatous liver disease, abscess, amyloidosis of the liver and peripheral arterial disease. Mild elevation of ALP can be seen in liver cirrhosis, hepatitis, and congestive cardiac failure. Transient hyperphosphataemia is a benign condition in infants, and can reach normal level in 4 months. In contrast, low levels of ALP is found in hypothyroidism, pernicious anemia, zinc deficiency, and hypophosphatasia.

ALP activity is significantly increased in the third trimester of pregnancy. This is due to increased synthesis from the placenta as well as increased synthesis in the liver induced by large amounts of estrogens. Levels in the third trimester can be as much as 2-fold greater than in non-pregnant women. As a result, ALP is not a reliable marker of hepatic function in pregnant women. In contrast to ALP, levels of ALT, AST, GGT, and lactate dehydrogenase are only slightly changed or largely unchanged during pregnancy. Bilirubin levels are significantly decreased in pregnancy.

In pregnancy conditions such as hyperemesis gravidarum, ALP levels can reach 215 IU/L, meanwhile, in pre-eclampsia, ALP can reach 14 IU/L, and in HELLP syndrome ALP levels can reach 15 IU/L.

=== Gamma-glutamyltransferase (GGT) ===
Reference range
9 to 85 IU/L

GGT is a microsomal enzyme found in hepatocytes, biliary epithelial cells, renal tubules, pancreas, and intestines. It helps in glutathione metabolism by transporting peptides across the cell membrane. Much like ALP, GGT measurements are usually elevated if cholestasis is present. In acute viral hepatitis, the GGT levels can peak at 2nd and 3rd week of illness, and remained elevated at 6 weeks of illness. GGT is also elevated in 30% of the hepatitis C patients. GGT can increase by 10 times in alcoholism. GGT can increase by 2 to 3 times in 50% of the patients with non-alcoholic liver disease. When GGT levels are elevated, the triglyceride level is elevated also. With insulin treatment, the GGT level can reduce. Other causes of elevated GGT are: diabetes mellitus, acute pancreatitis, myocardial infarction, anorexia nervosa, Guillain–Barré syndrome, hyperthyroidism, obesity and myotonic dystrophy.

In pregnancy conditions GGT activity is reduced in 2nd and 3rd trimesters. In hyperemesis gravidarum, GGT level value can reach 45 IU/L, 17 IU/L in pre-eclampsia, and 35 IU/L in HELPP syndrome.

=== Albumin ===
Reference range
3.5 to 5.3 g/dL

Albumin is a protein made specifically by the liver, and can be measured cheaply and easily. It is the main constituent of total protein (the remaining constituents are primarily globulins). Albumin levels are decreased in chronic liver disease, such as cirrhosis. It is also decreased in nephrotic syndrome, where it is lost through the urine. The consequence of low albumin can be edema since the intravascular oncotic pressure becomes lower than the extravascular space. An alternative to albumin measurement is prealbumin, which is better at detecting acute changes (half-life of albumin and prealbumin is about 2 weeks and about 2 days, respectively).

== Other tests ==
Other tests are requested alongside LFT to rule out specific causes.

=== 5' Nucleotidase ===
Reference range
0 to 15 IU/L

5' Nucleotidase (5NT) is a glycoprotein found throughout the body, in the cytoplasmic membrane, catalyzing the conversion to inorganic phosphates from nucleoside-5-phosphate. Its level is raised in conditions such as obstructive jaundice, parenchymal liver disease, liver metastases, and bone disease.

Serum NT levels are higher during 2nd and 3rd trimesters in pregnancy.

=== Ceruloplasmin ===
Reference range
200–600 mg/L

Ceruloplasmin is an acute phase protein synthesized in the liver. It is the carrier of the copper ion. Its level is increased in infections, rheumatoid arthritis, pregnancy, non-Wilson liver disease and obstructive jaundice. In Wilson disease, the ceruloplasmin level is depressed which lead to copper accumulation in body tissues.

=== Alpha-fetoprotein ===
Reference range
0-15 μg/L

Alpha-fetoprotein (AFP) is significantly expressed in foetal liver. However, the mechanism that led to the suppression of AFP synthesis in adults is not fully known. Exposure of the liver to cancer-causing agents and arrest of liver maturation in childhood can lead to the rise in AFP. AFP can reach until 400–500 μg/L in hepatocellular carcinoma. AFP concentration of more than 400 μg/L is associated with greater tumour size, involvement of both lobes of liver, portal vein invasion and a lower median survival rate.

=== Coagulation test ===
The liver is responsible for the production of the vast majority of coagulation factors. In patients with liver disease, international normalized ratio (INR) can be used as a marker of liver synthetic function as it includes factor VII, which has the shortest half life (2–6 hours) of all coagulation factors measured in INR. An elevated INR in patients with liver disease, however, does not necessarily mean the patient has a tendency to bleed, as it only measures procoagulants and not anticoagulants. In liver disease the synthesis of both are decreased and some patients are even found to be hypercoagulable (increased tendency to clot) despite an elevated INR. In liver patients, coagulation is better determined by more modern tests such as thromboelastogram (TEG) or thomboelastrometry (ROTEM).

Prothrombin time (PT) and its derived measures of prothrombin ratio (PR) and INR are measures of the extrinsic pathway of coagulation. This test is also called "ProTime INR" and "INR PT". They are used to determine the clotting tendency of blood, in the measure of warfarin dosage, liver damage, and vitamin K status.

=== Serum glucose ===
The serum glucose test, abbreviated as "BG" or "Glu", measures the liver's ability to produce glucose (gluconeogenesis); it is usually the last function to be lost in the setting of fulminant liver failure.

=== Lactate dehydrogenase ===
Lactate dehydrogenase (LDH) is found in many body tissues, including the liver. Elevated levels of LDH may indicate liver damage. LDH isotype-1 (or cardiac) is used for estimating damage to cardiac tissue, although troponin and creatine kinase tests are preferred.

== See also ==
- Reference ranges for blood tests
- Elevated transaminases
- LiMAx test
- Liver disorders
- Child–Pugh score
