= Exalenz Bioscience =

American biotechnology company

Exalenz Bioscience Ltd. is a biotechnology company that develops and manufactures non-invasive diagnostic medical devices for gastrointestinal and liver conditions. The company's technology uses a continuous flow of a patient's breath to diagnose illness. Exalenz is headquartered in Modi’in, Israel and is publicly traded on the Tel Aviv Stock Exchange as EXEN. U.S. headquarters are in Jersey City, New Jersey.

Exalenz's devices use real time breath gas analysis to detect the ratio between different carbon dioxide isotopes - ^{13}CO_{2} and ^{12}CO_{2}. The detection technology is termed Molecular Correlation Spectroscopy (MCS). Laser-like light sources emit infrared beams in the absorption spectrum for CO_{2} only. This absorption is measured. MCS is extremely sensitive and can work with smaller sample cells and a lower breath flow rate than other breath methods. Minute differences in the gas ratio indicate the presence of certain gastric or liver diseases, including gastroparesis, liver failure, fatty liver and liver cancer.

Exalenz's BreathID, a first generation device, received an EU CE Mark on March 18, 2002, and the U.S. Food and Drug Administration (FDA) on July 9, 2001. A second generation product, BreathID Hp Breath Test System, received an EU CE Mark on April 18, 2013, and FDA clearance on May 22, 2013. The BreathID Hp Breath Test System is used to perform a diagnostic test for the presence of Helicobacter pylori, a bacterium that can cause peptic ulcers and is associated with gastric cancer. H.pylori is a very common bacterium, reported to be present in up to two-thirds of the world population. Blood or stool tests are also used to diagnose H. pylori. It takes days to get results from either test. The BreathID Hp test takes 10–15 minutes. Physicians receive results at the end of the test.
