= Breath gas analysis =

- Purpose: gaining information on the clinical state of an individual by monitoring volatile organic compounds present in the exhaled breath

Breath gas analysis is a method for gaining information on the clinical state of an individual by monitoring volatile organic compounds (VOCs) present in the exhaled breath. Exhaled breath is naturally produced by the human body through expiration and therefore can be collected non-invasively and in an unlimited way. VOCs in exhaled breath can represent biomarkers for certain pathologies (lung cancer, asthma, chronic obstructive pulmonary disease and others). Breath gas concentration can then be related to blood concentrations via mathematical modeling as for example in blood alcohol testing. There are various techniques that can be employed to collect and analyze exhaled breath. Research on exhaled breath started many years ago, there is currently limited clinical application of it for disease diagnosis. However, this might change in the near future as currently large implementation studies are starting globally.

== History ==
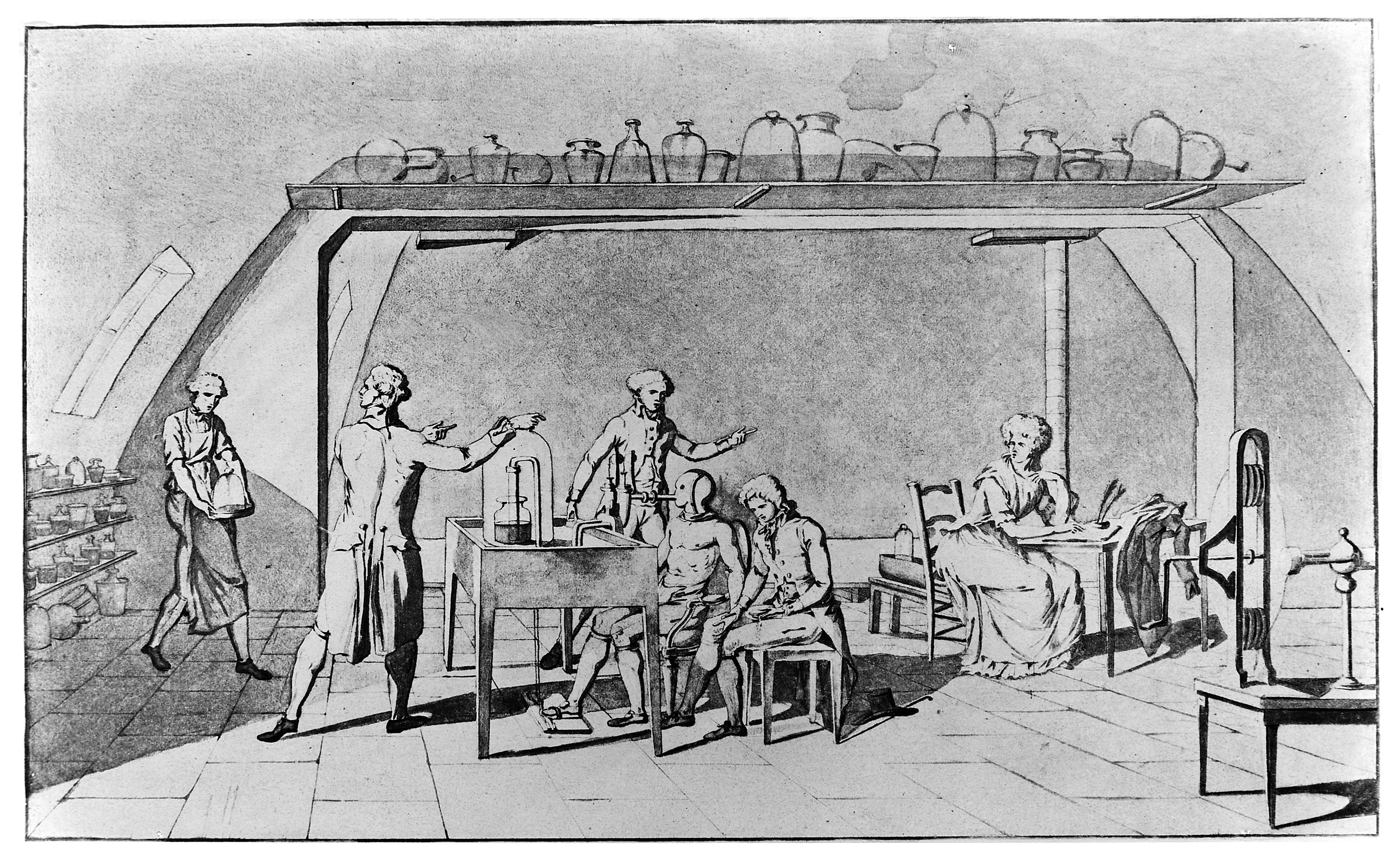
Lavoiser in his laboratory studying human respiration.

It is known that since the times of Hippocrates, exhaled breath analysis was performed with the aim of disease diagnosis. For example, it was believed that the exhaled breath of a diabetes person presented a sweet odor, while for people affected by kidney failure it showed a fish-like smell. Only with Antonie Lavoisier, the pure smelling of human exhaled breath was substituted by a systematic analysis of the chemical contents. The area of modern breath testing started in 1971, when Nobel Prize winner Linus Pauling demonstrated that human breath is a complex gas, containing more than 200 different VOCs. Later, more than 3000 VOCs have been identified in exhaled breath. In recent years, many scientists have focused on the analysis of exhaled breath with the aim of identifying disease-specific biomarkers at early stages. Lung cancer, COPD and head and neck cancer are among the diseases that have been considered for biomarker detection. Even though exhaled breath analysis started many years ago, there is still no clinical application of it for disease diagnosis. This is mainly due to a lack of standardization of the clinical tests, both for breath collection procedures and their analysis. Though the use of so-called breath-prints, determined by electronic noses, are promising and seem to be able to distinguish between lung cancer, COPD, and asthma. They also seem capable of detecting the various phenotypes of asthma and COPD and other diseases

== Overview ==
Endogenous volatile organic compounds (VOCs) are released within the human organism as a result of normal metabolic activity or due to pathological disorders. They enter the blood stream and are eventually metabolized or excreted via exhalation, skin emission, urine, etc.

Identification and quantification of potential disease biomarkers can be seen as the driving force for the analysis of exhaled breath. Moreover, future applications for medical diagnosis and therapy control with dynamic assessments of normal physiological function or pharmacodynamics are intended.

Exogenous VOCs penetrating the body as a result of environmental exposure can be used to quantify body burden. Also breath tests are often based on the ingestion of isotopically labeled precursors, producing isotopically labeled carbon dioxide and potentially many other metabolites.

However, breath sampling is far from being a standardized procedure due to the numerous confounding factors biasing the concentrations of volatiles in breath. These factors are related to both the breath sampling protocols as well as the complex physiological mechanisms underlying pulmonary gas exchange. Even under resting conditions exhaled breath concentrations of VOCs can be strongly influenced by specific physiological parameters such as cardiac output and breathing patterns, depending on the physico-chemical properties of the compound under study.

Understanding the influence of all the factors and their control is necessary for achieving an accurate standardization of breath sample collection and for the correct deduction of the corresponding blood concentration levels.

The simplest model relating breath gas concentration to blood concentrations was developed by Farhi

$$C_A = \frac{C_{\bar v}}{\lambda_\text{b:air} + \dot V_A/\dot Q_c},$$

where $C_A$ denotes the alveolar concentration which is assumed to be equal to the measured concentration. It expresses the fact that the concentration of an inert gas in the alveolar air depends on the mixed venous concentration $C_{\bar v}$, the substance-specific blood:air partition coefficient $\lambda_\text{b:air}$, and the ventilation-perfusion ratio $\dot V_A/\dot Q_c$. But this model fails when two prototypical substances like acetone (partition coefficient $\lambda_\text{b:air} = 340$) or isoprene (partition coefficient $\lambda_\text{b:air} = 0.75$ ) are measured.

E.g., multiplying the proposed population mean of approximately $1 \mu g/L$ acetone in end-tidal breath by the partition coefficient $\lambda_\text{b:air} = 340$ at body temperature grossly underestimates observed (arterial) blood levels spreading around $1 mg/L$. Furthermore, breath profiles of acetone (and other highly soluble volatile compounds such as 2-pentanone or methyl acetate) associated with moderate workload ergometer challenges of normal healthy volunteers drastically depart from the trend suggested by the equation above; hence some more refined models are necessary. Such models have been developed.

== Applications ==
Breath gas analysis is used in a number of breath tests.

- Asthma detection by exhaled nitric oxide
- Blood alcohol testing
- Cancer detection
- Carbon monoxide poisoning
- Chronic kidney disease (CKD) & Diabetes mellitus
- Diabetes detection
- Diagnosis of bad breath
- Fructose malabsorption with hydrogen breath test
- Helicobacter pylori with urea breath test
- Liver function
- Measurement of endogenous metabolic processes
- Monitoring uptake of disinfection by-products following swimming
- Organ rejection
- Smoking cessation

== Breath collectors ==
Breath can be collected using a variety of home-made and commercially available devices. Some examples of breath collection tools used across the research industry for VOC analysis are:

- Coated stainless steel canister
- End tidal air collector
- Tedlar bag

These devices can be used as a vehicle for direct introduction of a gas sample into an appropriate analytical instrument, or serve as a reservoir of breath gas into which an absorption device such as an SPME fiber is placed to collect specific compounds.

== Online analysis ==
Breath can also be analyzed online, which allows for insight into a person's metabolism without the need for sample preparation or sample collection. Technologies that enable real-time analysis of breath include:

- Proton Transfer Reaction Mass Spectromerty (PTR-MS)
- Secondary Electrospray Ionization Mass Spectrometry (SESI-MS)
- Selected ion flow tube mass spectrometry (SIFT-MS)

Breath analysis is very vulnerable to confounding factors. Analyzing breath in real-time has the advantage that potential confounding factors associated with sample handling and manipulation are eliminated. Recent efforts have focused on standardizing online breath analysis procedures based on SESI-MS, and to systematically study and reduce other confounding sources of variability.

== Analytical instruments ==
Breath analysis can be done with various forms of mass spectrometry, but there are also simpler methods for specific purposes, such as the Halimeter and the breathalyzer.

- Gas chromatography-mass spectrometry GC-MS
- Gas chromatography-UV spectrometry GC-UV
- Proton transfer reaction mass spectrometry PTR-MS and PTR-TOF
- Selected ion flow tube mass spectrometry SIFT-MS
- Ion mobility spectrometry IMS
- Fourier transform infrared spectroscopy FTIR
- Laser spectrometry Spectroscopy
- Individual Chemical sensors or chemical sensor arrays, operate as Electronic noses
- Secondary electrospray ionization SESI-MS
