= CLIA =

CLIA may refer to:

- Chemiluminescent immunoassay
- Clinical Laboratory Improvement Amendments
- Cruise Lines International Association
