= Gas analysis =

Gas analysis may refer to:

- Blood gas analysis, a method that measures arterial oxygen tension, carbon dioxide tension, and other aspects of a blood sample
- Breath gas analysis, a non-invasive method that measures volatile organic compounds present in the exhaled breath
- Dissolved gas analysis, a method that measures dissolved gases in insulating fluids
- Evolved gas analysis, a method that measures the gas evolved from a heated sample that undergoes decomposition or desorption
- Breathing gas analysis, especially for breathing gas mixtures
- Trace gas analysis, as an application of mass spectrometry, ion-mobility spectrometry or a combination of the two methods

Gas analyzer may refer to:

- Infrared gas analyzer
- Residual gas analyzer
- Orsat gas analyser
- Thermal and Evolved Gas Analyzer, a scientific instrument aboard the Phoenix spacecraft
- Helium analyzer, an instrument to measure the concentration of helium in a gas mixture
- Electro-galvanic oxygen sensor, a device which consumes a fuel to produce an electrical output by a chemical reaction
