= NIOX Group =

NIOX Group plc
- Type: Public limited company
- Traded as: LSE: NIOX
- Industry: Medical Devices
- Founded: 2006; 20 years ago
- Founders: Steve Harris and Charles Swingland
- Headquarters: Oxford, United Kingdom
- Key people: Ian Johnson (Non-Executive Chairman); Jonathan Emms (CEO); Sarah Duncan (CFO)
- Products: NIOX PRO®, NIOX VERO®, NIOX Cloud™, FeNO by NIOX®
- Revenue: ▲£48.7 million (2025)
- Operating income: ▲£10.7 million (2025)
- Net income: ▲£7 million (2025)
- Website: www.niox.com

NIOX Group is a British medical device manufacturing company focussed on products for treating people suffering from respiratory diseases. It produces its NIOX (Nitric Oxide) range of FeNO (Fractional Exhaled Nitric Oxide) devices to help diagnose and manage asthma.

The company is a provider of point-of-care FeNO (Fractional Exhaled Nitric Oxide) measurement and monitoring. The company is listed on the London Stock Exchange.

== History ==
The company was founded by Steve Harris and Charles Swingland as Circassia Group in 2006. It was the subject of an initial public offering in March 2014.

In May 2015, the company announced plans to acquire Aerocrine AB. Founded in 1997, Aerocrine was the first company to develop commercial fractional exhaled nitric oxide (FeNO) testing.

In December 2019, Steve Harris announced that he was resigning as CEO of the company. Ian Johnson took over as Executive Chairman of the company, Michael Roller replaced Julien Cotta as the Chief Financial Officer, and Jonathan Emms, who was appointed to the company in September 2019, became the Chief Operating Officer.

The company also announced its withdrawal from the COPD (chronic obstructive pulmonary disease) business in April 2020, with a proposed transfer of assets to, and termination of agreement with, AstraZeneca for consideration to be set off against debt and accrued interest.

In 2022 the company changed its name from Circassia Group plc to NIOX Group plc.

In January 2025, the company announced that Jonathan Emms would become CEO and that Sarah Duncan would succeed Micheal Roller, who was leaving to retire, as CFO in May 2025.

== Operations ==
NIOX Group has direct offices in the United Kingdom, United States, Germany, Sweden and China. The company also operates through a distribution model, working with partner companies in order make NIOX available throughout the globe.

== Products ==
NIOX (Nitric Oxide) is a FeNO testing device. Using visual aids and sounds, NIOX provides an easy-to-use test experience to help patients perform FeNO (Fractional Exhaled Nitric Oxide) tests.

FeNO aids healthcare professionals with the diagnosis and management of airway inflammation in conditions such as asthma and COPD.

In its 2025 annual report, the company said it had started developing a FeNO testing device designed for home use.
