= David Smith (chemical physicist) =

British chemical physicist

David Smith FRS (26 November 1935—15 February 2023) was a British chemical physicist who investigated gas-phase ionic reactions between ions, electrons and molecules. For this work he developed the selected ion flow tube (SIFT) technique, an analytical method that evolved in to the widely used SIFT-mass spectrometry.

== Career ==
In 1991, he took up a professorship at the Innsbruck University Institute for Ion Physics, and returned to the UK in 1996, returning to Keele University, where he would remain until retirement in 2016. His work continued though with collaboration with the J. Heyrovský Institute of Physical Chemistry in Prague.

He was a Fellow of the Institute of Physics.
