= Selected-ion flow-tube mass spectrometry =

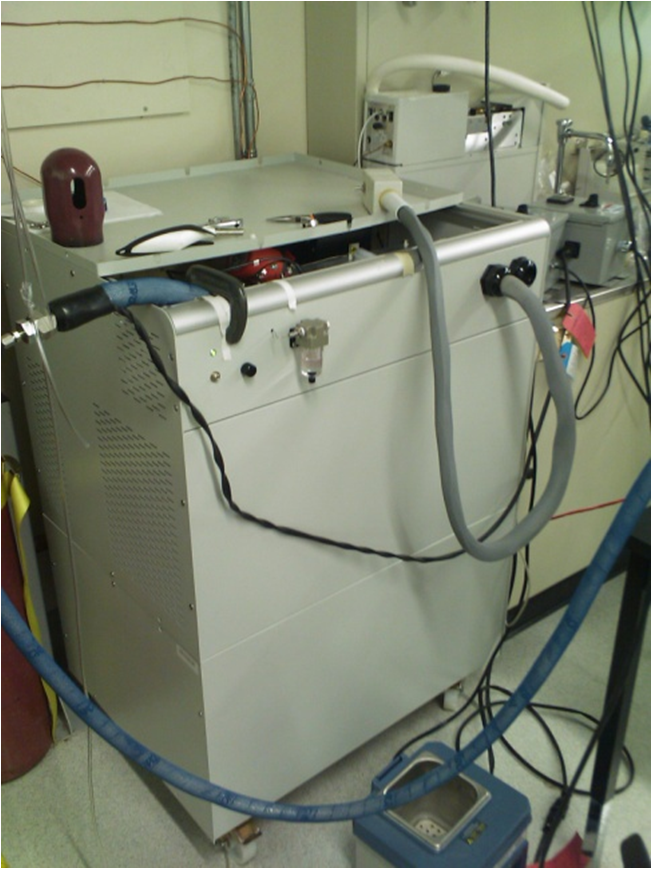
Picture of SIFT-MS profile 3.

Selected-ion flow-tube mass spectrometry (SIFT-MS) is a quantitative mass spectrometry technique for trace gas analysis which involves the chemical ionization of trace volatile compounds by selected positive precursor ions during a well-defined time period along a flow tube. Absolute concentrations of trace compounds present in air, breath or the headspace of bottled liquid samples can be calculated in real time from the ratio of the precursor and product ion signal ratios, without the need for sample preparation or calibration with standard mixtures. The detection limit of commercially available SIFT-MS instruments extends to the single digit pptv range.

The instrument is an extension of the selected ion flow tube, SIFT, technique, which was first described in 1976 by Adams and Smith. It is a fast flow tube/ion swarm method to react positive or negative ions with atoms and molecules under truly thermalised conditions over a wide range of temperatures. It has been used extensively to study ion-molecule reaction kinetics. Its application to ionospheric and interstellar ion chemistry over a 20-year period has been crucial to the advancement and understanding of these topics.

SIFT-MS was initially developed for use in human breath analysis, and has shown great promise as a non-invasive tool for physiological monitoring and disease diagnosis. It has since shown potential for use across a wide variety of fields, particularly in the life sciences, such as agriculture and animal husbandry, environmental research and food technology.

Two main commercial implementations of this technology exist:

• Syft Technologies Christchurch, New Zealand) offers SIFT-MS instruments (e.g., Voice series), which are the most widely recognized and have popularized the technique for real-time trace gas analysis.

• Young In ACE (South Korea) provides the ACE 1100 IMR-MS (Ion Molecule Reaction Mass Spectrometer), developed based on SIFT technology for real-time qualitative and quantitative analysis of volatile organic compounds (VOCs).

These instruments enable direct, chromatography-free analysis with soft chemical ionization using reagent ions such as H₃O⁺, NO⁺, and O₂⁺.

The SIFT technique, which is the basis of SIFT-MS, was conceived and developed in the 1970s at the University of Birmingham, England, by Nigel Adams and David Smith.

== Instrumentation ==
In the selected ion flow tube mass spectrometer, SIFT-MS, ions are generated in a microwave plasma ion source, usually from a mixture of laboratory air and water vapor. From the formed plasma, a single ionic species is selected using a quadrupole mass filter to act as "precursor ions" (also frequently referred to as primary or reagent ions in SIFT-MS and other processes involving chemical ionization). In SIFT-MS analyses, H_{3}O^{+}, NO^{+} and O_{2}^{+} are used as precursor ions, and these have been chosen because they are known not to react significantly with the major components of air (nitrogen, oxygen, etc.), but can react with many of the very low level (trace) gases.

The selected precursor ions are injected into a flowing carrier gas (usually helium at a pressure of 1 Torr) via a Venturi orifice (~1 mm diameter) where they travel along the reaction flow tube by convection. Concurrently, the neutral analyte molecules of a sample vapor enter the flow tube, via a heated sampling tube, where they meet the precursor ions and may undergo chemical ionization, depending on their chemical properties, such as their proton affinity or ionization energy.

The newly formed "product ions" flow into the mass spectrometer chamber, which contains a second quadrupole mass filter, and an electron multiplier detector, which are used to separate the ions by their mass-to-charge ratios (m/z) and measure the count rates of the ions in the desired m/z range.

== Analysis ==
The concentrations of individual compounds can be derived largely using the count rates of the precursor and product ions, and the reaction rate coefficients, k. Exothermic proton transfer reactions with H_{3}O^{+} are assumed to proceed at the collisional rate (see Collision theory), the coefficient for which, k_{c}, is calculable using the method described by Su and Chesnavich, providing the polarizability and dipole moment are known for the reactant molecule. NO^{+} and O_{2}^{+} reactions proceed at k_{c} less frequently, and thus the reaction rates of the reactant molecule with these precursor ions must often be derived experimentally by comparing the decline in the count rates of each of the NO^{+} and O_{2}^{+} precursor ions to that of H_{3}O^{+} as the sample flow of reactant molecules is increased. The product ions and rate coefficients have been derived in this way for well over 200 volatile compounds, which can be found in the scientific literature.

The instrument can be programmed either to scan across a range of masses to produce a mass spectrum (Full Scan, FS, mode), or to rapidly switch between only the m/z values of interest (Multiple Ion Monitoring, MIM, mode). Due to the different chemical properties of the aforementioned precursor ions (H_{3}O^{+}, NO^{+}, and O_{2}^{+}), different FS mode spectra can be produced for a vapor sample, and these can give different information relating to the composition of the sample. Using this information, it is often possible to identify the trace compound(s) that are present. The MIM mode, on the other hand will usually employ a much longer dwell time on each ion, and as a result, accurate quantification is possible to the parts per billion (ppb) level.

SIFT-MS utilises an extremely soft ionisation process which greatly simplifies the resulting spectra and thereby facilitates the analysis of complex mixtures of gases, such as human breath. Another very soft ionization technique is secondary electrospray ionization (SESI-MS). For example, even proton-transfer-reaction mass spectrometry (PTR-MS), another soft ionisation technology that uses the H_{3}O^{+} reagent ion, has been shown to give considerably more product ion fragmentation than SIFT-MS.

Another key feature of SIFT-MS is the upstream mass quadrupole, which allows the use of multiple precursor ions. The ability to use three precursor ions, H_{3}O^{+}, NO^{+} and O_{2}^{+}, to obtain three different spectra is extremely valuable because it allows the operator to analyse a much wider variety of compounds. An example of this is methane, which cannot be analysed using H_{3}O^{+} as a precursor ion (because it has a proton affinity of 543.5kJ/mol, somewhat less than that of H_{2}O), but can be analysed using O_{2}^{+}. Furthermore, the parallel use of three precursor ions may allow the operator to distinguish between two or more compounds that react to produce ions of the same mass-to-charge ratio in certain spectra. For example, dimethyl sulfide (C_{2}H_{6}S, 62 amu) accepts a proton when it reacts with H_{3}O^{+} to generate C_{2}H_{7}S^{+} product ions which appear at m/z 63 in the resulting spectrum. This may conflict with other product ions, such as the association product from the reaction with carbon dioxide, H_{3}O^{+}CO_{2}, and the single hydrate of the protonated acetaldehyde ion, C_{2}H_{5}O^{+}(H_{2}O), which also appear at m/z 63, and so it may be unidentifiable in certain samples. However dimethyl sulfide reacts with NO^{+} by charge transfer, to produce the ion C_{2}H_{6}S^{+}, which appears at m/z 62 in resulting spectra, whereas carbon dioxide does not react with NO^{+}, and acetaldehyde donates a hydride ion, giving a single product ion at m/z 43, C_{2}H_{3}O^{+}, and so dimethyl sulfide can be easily distinguished.

Over recent years, advances in SIFT-MS technology have vastly increased the sensitivity of these devices such that the limits of detection now extend down to the single-digit-ppt level.

== Literature ==
- "The selected ion flow tube (SIFT); A technique for studying ion-neutral reactions" Adams N.G., Smith D.; International Journal of Mass Spectrometry and Ion Physics 21 (1976) pp. 349–359.
- "Parametrization of the ion-polar molecule collision rate constant by trajectory calculations" Su T., Chesnavich W.J.; Journal of Chemical Physics 76 (1982) pp. 5183–5186.
- "Selected ion flow tube mass spectrometry (SIFT-MS) for on-line trace gas analysis" Smith D., Španěl P.; Mass Spectrometry Reviews 24 (2005) pp. 661–700.
- "Quantification of methane in humid air and exhaled breath using selected ion flow tube mass spectrometry" Dryahina K., Smith D., Španěl P.; Rapid Communications in Mass Spectrometry 24 (2010) pp. 1296–1304.
