= Urea breath test =

Medical test for a bacterial infection

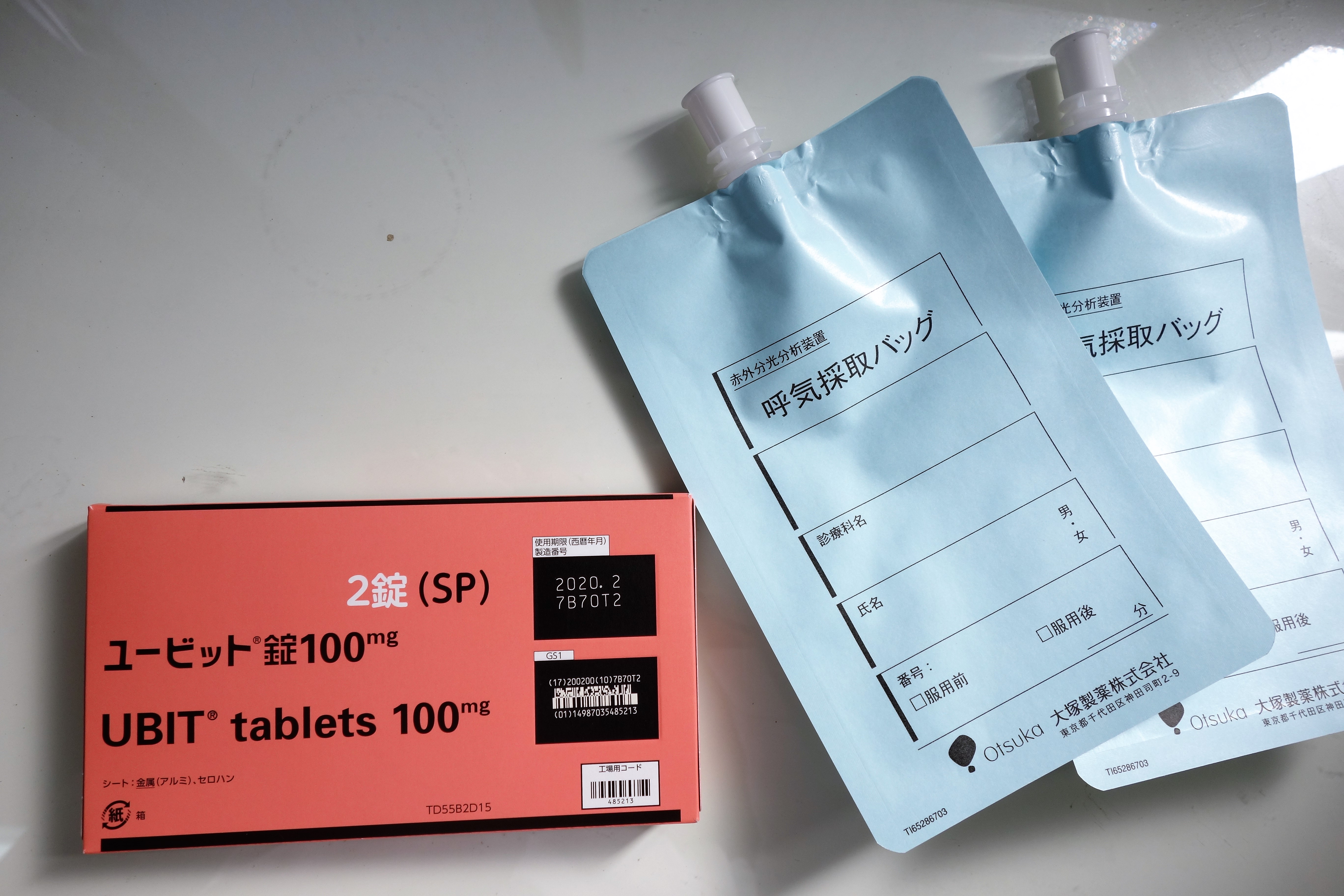
- Urea breath test, UBT-KIT for "Helicobacter pylori", (Ubit Tab; left)
- ICD-9-CM: 89.39

The urea breath test is a rapid diagnostic procedure used to identify infections by Helicobacter pylori, a spiral bacterium implicated in gastritis, gastric ulcer, and peptic ulcer disease. It is based upon the ability of H. pylori to convert urea to ammonia and carbon dioxide. Urea breath tests are recommended in leading society guidelines as a preferred non-invasive choice for detecting H. pylori before and after treatment.

== Principles and mechanism ==
Patients swallow urea labelled with an uncommon isotope, either radioactive carbon-14 (nowadays preferred in many countries) or non-radioactive carbon-13. In the subsequent 10–30 minutes, the detection of isotope-labelled carbon dioxide in exhaled breath indicates that the urea was split; this indicates that urease (the enzyme that H. pylori uses to metabolize urea to produce ammonia) is present in the stomach, and hence that H. pylori bacteria are present.

For the two different forms of urea, different instrumentation is required. Carbon-14 is normally measured by scintillation, whereas carbon-13 can be detected by isotope ratio mass spectrometry (IRMS) or simpler by nondispersive infrared (NDIR) spectrometry. For each of these methods, a baseline breath sample is required before taking the isotope-labeled urea, for comparison with the post-urea sample, with a 15- to 30-minute duration between them. Samples may be sent to a reference laboratory for analysis. Alternatively, NDIR spectrometry can be performed by a table-top instrument as an office-based test, and results are provided immediately within minutes.

The difference between the pre- and post urea measurements is used to determine infection. This value is compared to a cut-off value. Results below the value are assumed to be negative, those above positive. The cut-off value itself is determined by comparing the results of patients with two or more different detection methods. The value is chosen that gives the best combination of sensitivity and specificity. Both carbon-14 and carbon-13 urea breath tests have high sensitivity and specificity, though the carbon-13 test is preferred in certain populations due to its non-radioactive nature.

The test measures active H. pylori infection. If antibiotics are depressing the amount of H. pylori present, or the stomach conditions are less acidic than normal, the amount of urease present will be lessened.

Accordingly, the test should only be performed 14 days after stopping acid reducing medication (proton pump inhibitors, PPI) or 28 days after stopping antibiotic treatment. Some clinicians believe that a reservoir of H. pylori in dental plaque can affect the result.

The test is especially done accompanying an eradication therapy by antibiotics (to avoid overdosing) or to check the success of an ulcer operation. In both cases, immunological tests can give false positive results.

== See also ==
- Rapid urease test (done on at time of gastroscopy)
- Breath test
