= ECHO, Leahy Center for Lake Champlain =

Science and nature museum in Burlington, Vermont, United States

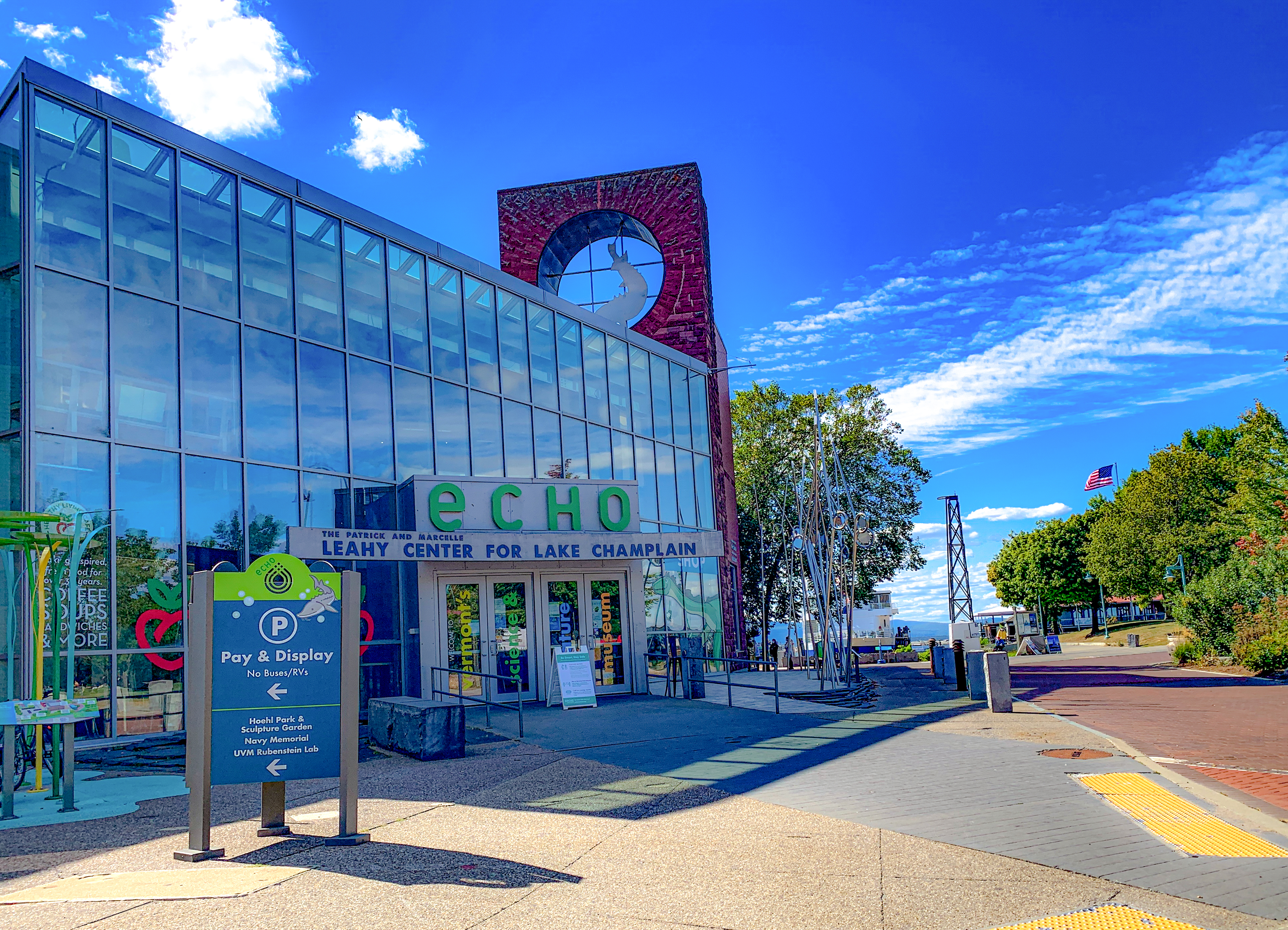
- ECHO, Leahy Center for Lake Champlain
- Established: 2003
- Location: 1 College Street; Burlington, Vermont
- Coordinates: 44.4765°N 73.2211°W
- Type: Science Center
- Visitors: 170,000
- Website: www.echovermont.org

ECHO, Leahy Center for Lake Champlain, formerly the Lake Champlain Basin Science Center, is a science and nature museum located on the Burlington waterfront in northern Vermont. This hands-on museum is home to several interactive exhibits such as Engineert It! and Awesome Forces; a 30-foot, 3D plesiosaur model of Champ, America's legendary lake monster in Lake Champlain; more than 70 species of fish, amphibians, invertebrates, and reptiles; special traveling exhibitions; and an immersive 3D Theater.

ECHO has been open to public since 2003, offering daily animal encounters and hands-on activities that are educational and family-friendly. The Patrick and Marcelle Leahy Center for Lake Champlain is a 2.2-acre (8,900 m^{2}) campus recognizing Senator Patrick Leahy's dedication to the stewardship of the Lake Champlain Basin. The Leahy Center is also home to the University of Vermont’s Rubenstein School of Environment and Natural Resources, Lake Champlain Basin Program Resource Room, and Lake Champlain Navy Memorial.

ECHO's building is Vermont’s first LEED certified Green Building. The building is the only lake aquarium in the United States with this certification. With this designation, ECHO is the third certified building in New England and joins a group of fewer than 70 LEED certified buildings in the United States. In 2018 the largest solar canopy in Vermont was built onsite to capture renewable energy. The name ECHO originally represented educating and delighting people of all ages about the Ecology, Culture, History, and Opportunities for stewardship of the Lake Champlain Basin.
