= Proton-transfer-reaction mass spectrometry =

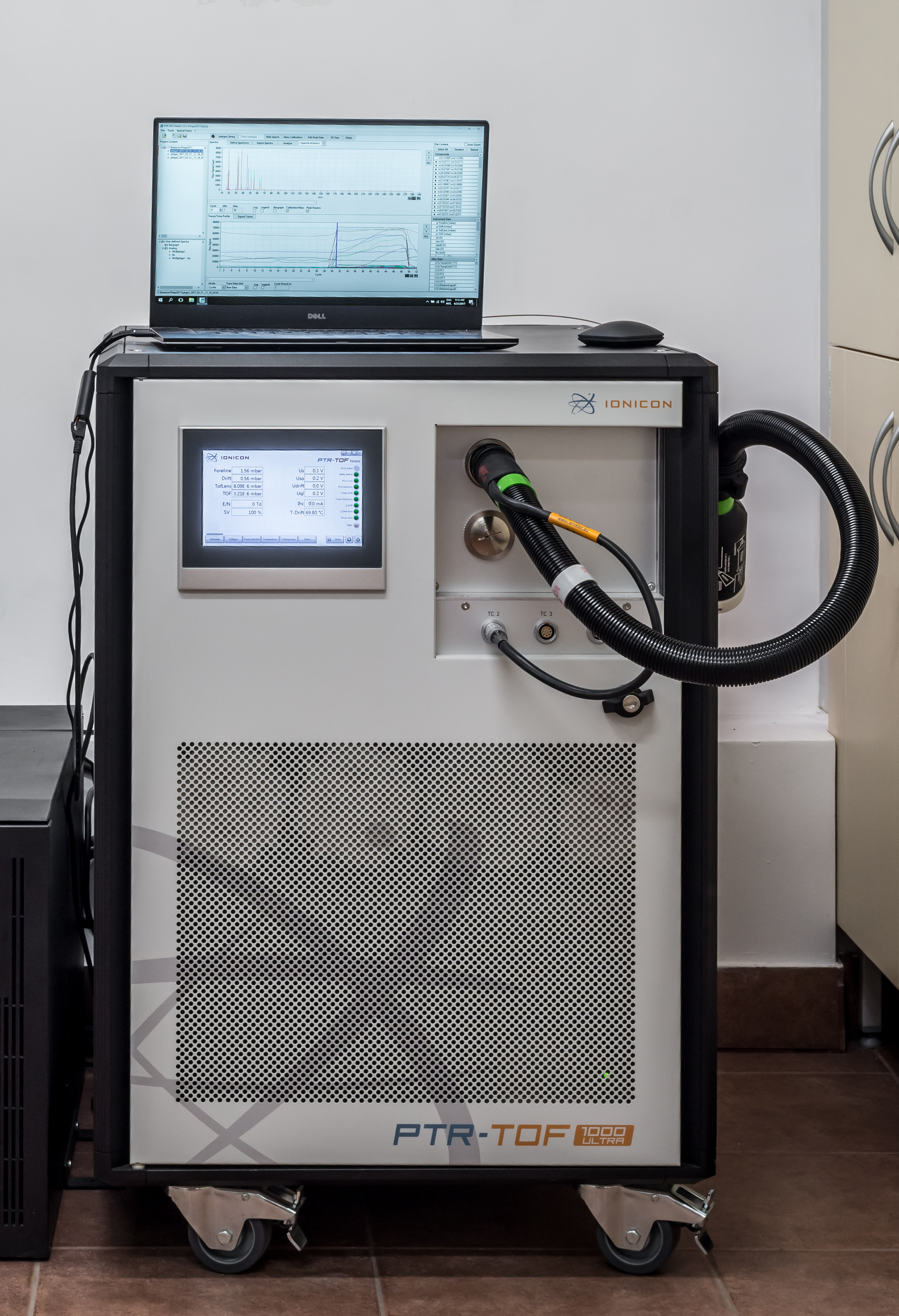
PTR-TOF mass spectrometer

Proton-transfer-reaction mass spectrometry (PTR-MS) is an analytical chemistry technique that uses gas phase hydronium reagent ions which are produced in an ion source. PTR-MS is used for online monitoring of volatile organic compounds (VOCs) in ambient air and was developed in 1995 by scientists at the Institut für Ionenphysik at the Leopold-Franzens University in Innsbruck, Austria. A PTR-MS instrument consists of an ion source that is directly connected to a drift tube (in contrast to SIFT-MS no mass filter is interconnected) and an analyzing system (quadrupole mass analyzer or time-of-flight mass spectrometer). Commercially available PTR-MS instruments have a response time of about 100 ms and reach a detection limit in the single digit pptv or even ppqv region. Established fields of application are environmental research, food and flavor science, biological research, medicine, security, cleanroom monitoring, etc.

== Theory ==
With H_{3}O^{+} as the reagent ion the proton transfer process is (with R being the trace component)

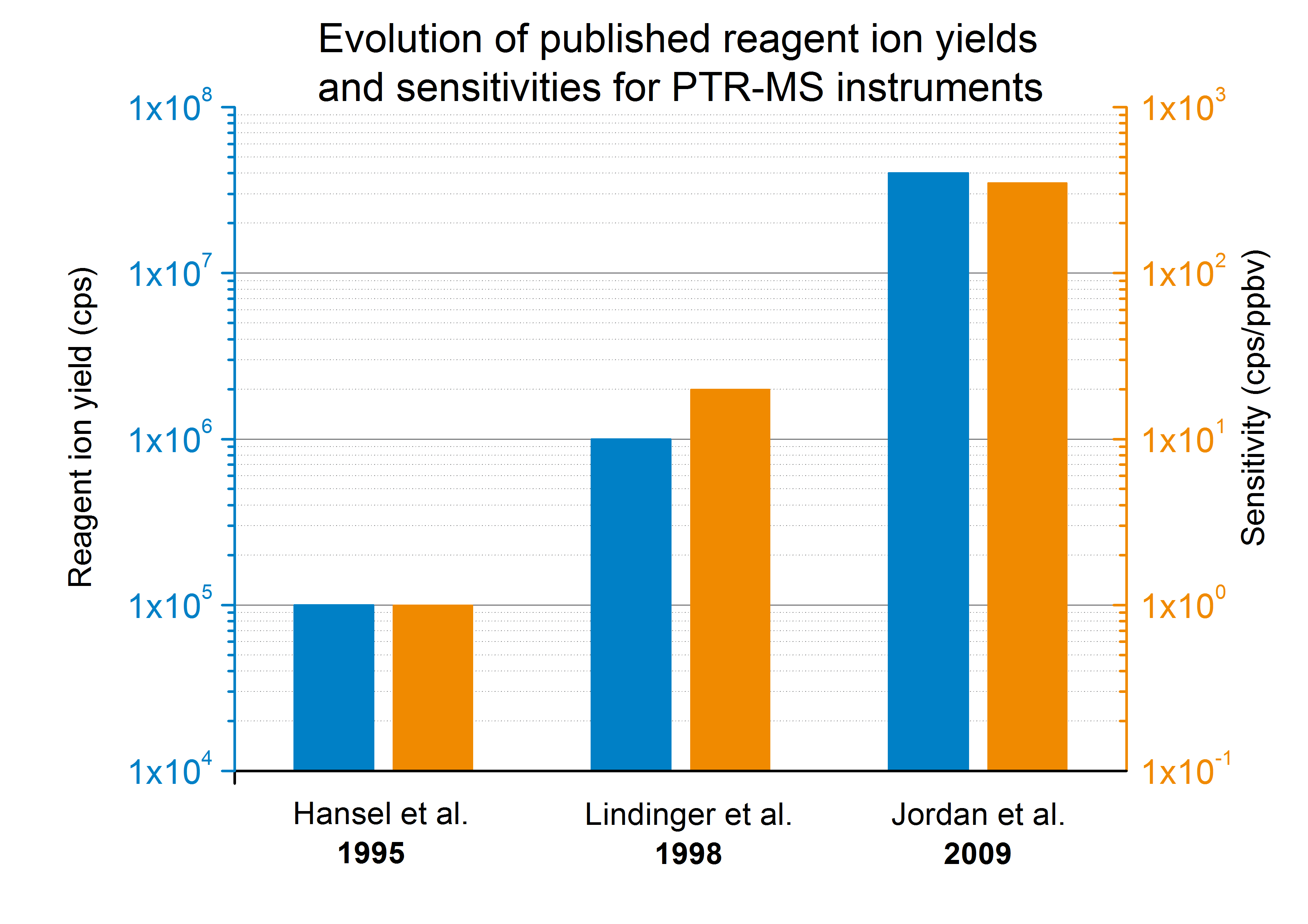
Fig. 1: Evolution of reagent ion yields and sensitivities of PTR-MS instruments taken from peer reviewed journal articles

$\ce{H3O+ + R -> RH+ + H2O}$	1

Reaction (1) is only possible if energetically allowed, i.e. if the proton affinity of R is higher than the proton affinity of H_{2}O (691 kJ/mol). As most components of ambient air possess a lower proton affinity than H_{2}O (e.g. N_{2}, O_{2}, Ar, CO_{2}, etc.) the H_{3}O^{+} ions only react with VOC trace components and the air itself acts as a buffer gas. Moreover, due to the low concentrations of trace components one can assume that the total number of H_{3}O^{+} ions remains nearly unchanged, which leads to the equation

$\ce{[RH+] = [H3O+]0} \left (1- e^{- k[\ce{R}] t}\right )\approx \ce{[H3O+]0 [R]} kt$	2

In equation (2) $\ce{[RH+]}$ is the density of product ions, $\ce{[H3O+]0}$ is the density of reagent ions in absence of reactant molecules in the buffer gas, k is the reaction rate constant and t is the average time the ions need to pass the reaction region. With a PTR-MS instrument the number of product and of reagent ions can be measured, the reaction rate constant can be found in literature for most substances and the reaction time can be derived from the set instrument parameters. Therefore, the absolute concentration of trace constituents $\ce{[R]}$ can be easily calculated without the need of calibration or gas standards. Furthermore, it gets obvious that the overall sensitivity of a PTR-MS instrument is dependent on the reagent ion yield. Fig. 1 gives an overview of several published (in peer-reviewed journals) reagent ion yields during the last decades and the corresponding sensitivities.

== Technology ==
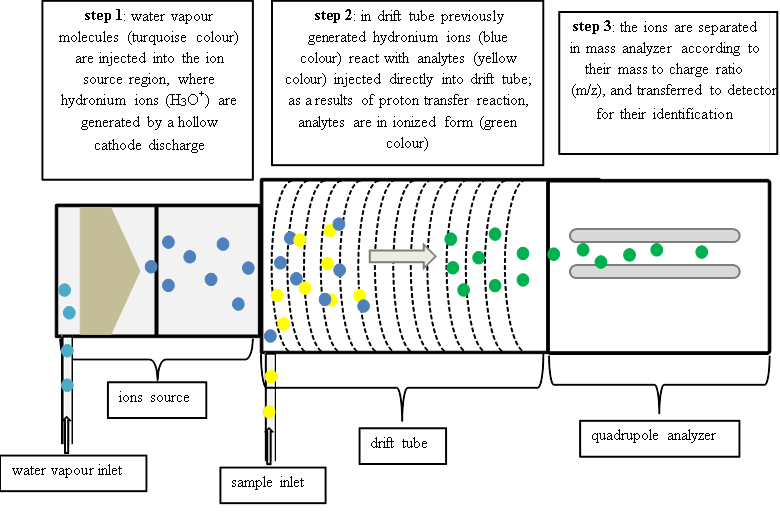
Hydronium ions generated from water vapor in an ionizer are reacting with analytes in a drift chamber. Ions are separated in an analyzer based on the mass-to-charge ratio, and are subsequently transferred to a detector where identification takes place.

In commercial PTR-MS instruments water vapor is ionized in a hollow cathode discharge:

$$\ce{e^- + H2O -> H2O+ + 2e^-}$$
$$\ce{e^- + H2O -> H2+ + O + 2e^-}$$
$$\ce{e^- + H2O -> H+ + OH + 2e^-}$$
$$\ce{e^- + H2O -> O+ + H2 + 2e^-}$$.

After the discharge a short drift tube is used to form very pure (>99.5%) H_{3}O^{+} via ion-molecule reactions:

$$\ce{H2+ + H2O -> H2O+ + H2}$$
$$\ce{H+ + H2O -> H2O+ + H}$$
$$\ce{O+ + H2O -> H2O+ + O}$$
$$\ce{H2O+ + H2O -> H3O+ + OH}$$.

Due to the high purity of the reagent ions a mass filter between the ion source and the reaction drift tube is not necessary and H_{3}O^{+} can be injected directly. The absence of this mass filter in turn greatly reduces losses of reagent ions and leads eventually to an outstandingly low detection limit of the whole instrument. In the reaction drift tube a vacuum pump is continuously drawing through air containing the VOCs one wants to analyze. At the end of the drift tube the protonated molecules are mass analyzed (quadrupole mass analyzer or time-of-flight mass spectrometer) and detected.

As an alternative to H_{3}O^{+} already in early PTR-MS related publications the use of NH_{4}^{+} reagent ions has been suggested. Ammonia has a proton affinity of 853.6 kJ/mol. For compounds that have a higher proton affinity than ammonia proton transfer can take place similar to the process described above for hydronium:

$$\ce{NH4+ + R -> RH+ + NH3}$$.

Additionally, for compounds with higher, but also for some with lower proton affinities than ammonia a clustering reaction can be observed

$\ce{NH4+ + R -> R.NH4+}$^{*}

where the cluster needs a third body to get collisionally stabilized. The main advantage of using NH_{4}^{+} reagent ions is that fragmentation of analytes upon chemical ionization is strongly suppressed, leading to straightforward mass spectra even for complex mixtures. The reason why during the first 20 years after the invention of PTR-MS NH_{4}^{+} reagent ions have only been used in a very limited number of studies is most probably because the NH_{4}^{+} production required toxic and corrosive ammonia as a source gas. This led to problems with handling the instrument and its exhaust gas, as well as to increased wear of vacuum components. In 2017 a patent application was submitted where the inventors introduced a novel method of NH_{4}^{+} production without the need of any form of ammonia. In this method N_{2} and water vapor are introduced into the hollow cathode ion source and by adjusting electric fields and pressures NH_{4}^{+} can be produced at the same or even higher purity levels than H_{3}O^{+}. It is expected that this invention, which eliminates the problems connected to the use of NH_{4}^{+} so far, will lead to a widespread use of NH_{4}^{+} reagent ions in the near future.

=== Advantages ===
Advantages include low fragmentation: only a small amount of energy is transferred during the ionization process (compared to e.g. electron ionization), therefore fragmentation is suppressed and the obtained mass spectra are easily interpretable. No sample preparation is necessary: VOC-containing air and headspaces over liquids can be analyzed directly, in real time. A typical response time of 100 ms enables online monitoring. Absolute concentrations are obtained directly without previous calibration measurements. Due to the simple design and the low number of parts needed for a PTR-MS instrument, it can be built in into space saving and even mobile housings. PTR-MS operation requires only electric power and a small amount of distilled water. Unlike other techniques, no gas cylinders are needed for buffer gas or calibration standards.

=== Disadvantages ===
One disadvantage is that not all molecules are detectable. Because only molecules with a proton affinity higher than water can be detected by PTR-MS, proton transfer from H_{3}O^{+} is not suitable for all fields of application. Therefore, in 2009 first PTR-MS instruments were presented, which are capable of switching between H_{3}O^{+} and O_{2}^{+} (and NO^{+}) as reagent ions. This enhances the number of detectable substances to important compounds like ethylene, acetylene, most halocarbons, etc. Furthermore, particularly with NO^{+} it is possible to separate and independently quantify some isomers. In 2012 a PTR-MS instrument was introduced which extends the selectable reagent ions to Kr^{+} and Xe^{+}; this should allow for the detection of nearly all possible substances (up to the ionization energy of krypton (14 eV)). Although the ionization method for these additional reagent ions is charge-exchange rather than proton-transfer ionization the instruments can still be considered as "classic" PTR-MS instruments, i.e. no mass filter between the ion source and the drift tube and only some minor modifications on the ion source and vacuum design.

The maximum measurable concentration is limited. Equation (2) is based on the assumption that the decrease of reagent ions is negligible, therefore the total concentration of VOCs in air must not exceed about 10 ppmv. Otherwise the instrument's response will not be linear anymore and the concentration calculation will be incorrect. This limitation can be overcome easily by diluting the sample with a well-defined amount of pure air.

== Sensitivity enhancing measures ==
As it is the case for most analytical instruments, also in PTR-MS there has always been a quest for sensitivity improvement and for lowering the detection limit. However, until 2012 these improvements were limited to optimizations of the conventional setup, i.e. ion source, DC drift tube, transfer lens system, mass spectrometer (compare above). The reason for this conservative approach was that the addition of any RF ion focusing device negatively affects the well-defined PTR-MS ion chemistry, which makes quantification complicated and considerably limits comparability of measurement results obtained with different instruments. Only in 2016 a patent application providing a solution to this problem was submitted.

=== Ion funnel ===
Ion funnels are RF devices which have been used for decades to focus ion currents into narrow beams. In PTR-MS they have been introduced in 2012 by Barber et al. when they presented a PTR-MS setup with a PTR reaction region incorporating an ion funnel. Although the focusing properties of the ion funnel improved the sensitivity of the setup by a factor of >200 (compared to operating in DC only mode, i.e. with the ion funnel turned off) for some compounds, the sensitivities of other compounds were only improved by a factor of <10. That is, because of the highly compound dependent instrumental response one of the main advantages of PTR-MS, namely that concentration values can be directly calculated, is lost and a calibration measurement is needed for each analyte of interest. Furthermore, with this approach unusual fragmentation of analytes has been observed which complicates interpretation of measurement results and comparison between different types of instruments even more. A different concept has been introduced by the company IONICON Analytik GmbH. (Innsbruck, AT) where the ion funnel is not predominantly part of the reaction region but mainly for focusing the ions into the transfer region to the TOF mass spectrometer. In combination with the above-mentioned method of controlling the ion chemistry this enables a considerable increase in sensitivity and thus also an improvement of the detection limit, while keeping the ion chemistry well-defined and thus avoiding problems with quantification and interpretation of the results.

=== Ion guide ===
Quadrupole, hexapole and other multipole ion guides can be used to transfer ions between different parts of an instrument with high efficiency. In PTR-MS they are particularly suitable for being installed in the differentially pumped interface between the reaction region and the mass spectrometer. In 2014 Sulzer et al. published an article about a PTR-MS instrument which utilizes a quadrupole ion guide between the drift tube and the TOF mass spectrometer. They reported an increase in sensitivity by a factor of 25 compared to a similar instrument without an ion guide. Quadrupole ion guides are known to have high focusing power, but also rather narrow m/z transmission bands. Hexapole ion guides on the other hand have focusing capabilities over a broader m/z band. Additionally, less energy is put into the transmitted ions, i.e. fragmentation and other adverse effects are less likely to occur. Consequently, some latest high-end PTR-MS instruments are equipped with hexapole ion guides for considerably improved performance or even with a sequential arrangement of an ion funnel followed by a hexapole ion guide for even higher sensitivity and lower detection limit.

== Add-ons ==
As a real-time trace gas analysis method based on mass spectrometry, PTR-MS has two obvious limitations: Isomers cannot be easily separated (for some it is possible by switching the reagent ions or by changing the reduced electric field strength in the drift tube) and the sample has to be in the gas phase. Countermeasures against these limitations have been developed in the form of add-ons, which can either be installed into the PTR-MS instrument or operated as external devices.

=== FastGC ===
Gas chromatography (GC) in combination with mass spectrometry (GC-MS) is capable of separating isomeric compounds. Although GC has been successfully coupled to PTR-MS in the past, this approach annihilates the real-time capability of the PTR-MS technology, because a single GC analysis run typically takes between 30 min and 1 h. Thus, state-of-the-art GC add-ons for PTR-MS are based on fastGC technology. Materic et al. utilized an early version of a commercially available fastGC addon in order to distinguish various monoterpene isomers. Within a fastGC run of about 70 s they were able to separate and identify: alpha-pinene, beta-pinene, camphene, myrcene, 3-carene and limonene in a standard mixture, Norway spruce, Scots pine and black pine samples, respectively. Particularly, if the operation mode of a PTR-MS instrument equipped with fastGC is continuously switched between fastGC and direct injection (dependent on the application, e.g. a loop sequence of one fastGC run followed by 10 min of direct injection measurement), real-time capability is preserved, while at the same time valuable information on substance identification and isomer separation is acquired.

=== Aerosol and particulate matter inlet ===
Researchers at the Leopold-Franzens University in Innsbruck invented a dedicated PTR-MS inlet system for the analysis of aerosols and particulate matter, which they called "CHemical Analysis of aeRosol ON-line (CHARON)". After further development work in collaboration with a PTR-MS manufacturer, CHARON has become readily available as an add-on for PTR-MS instruments in 2017. The add-on consists of a honeycomb activated charcoal denuder which adsorbs organic gases but transmits particles, an aerodynamic lens system that collimates sub-μm particles, and a thermo-desorber that evaporates non-refractory organic particulate matter at moderate temperatures of 100-160 °C and reduced pressures of a few mbar. So far, CHARON has predominantly been used within studies in the field of atmospheric chemistry, e.g. for airborne measurements of particulate organic matter and bulk organic aerosol analysis.

=== Inlet for liquids ===
A now well established setup for the controlled evaporation and subsequent analysis of liquids with PTR-MS has been published in 2013 by Fischer et al. As the authors saw the main application of their setup in the calibration of PTR-MS instruments via aqueous standards, they named it "Liquid Calibration Unit (LCU)". The LCU sprays a liquid standard into a gas stream at well-defined flow rates via a purpose-built nebulizer (optimized for reduced probability of clogging and high tolerance to salts in the liquid). The resulting micro-droplets are injected into a heated (> 100 °C) evaporation chamber. This concept offers two main advantages: (i) the evaporation of compounds is enhanced by the enlarged surface area of the droplets and (ii) compounds which are dissociated in water, such as acids (or bases), experience a shift in pH value when the water evaporates from a droplet. This in turn reduces dissociation and supports total evaporation of the compound. The resulting continuous gas flow containing the analytes can be directly introduced into a PTR-MS instrument for analysis.

== Applications ==
The most common applications for the PTR-MS technique are environmental research, waste incineration, food science, biological research, process monitoring, indoor air quality, medicine and biotechnology and Homeland security. Trace gas analysis is another common application. Some other techniques are Secondary electrospray ionization (SESI), Electrospray ionization (ESI), and Selected-ion flow-tube mass spectrometry (SIFT).

=== Food science ===
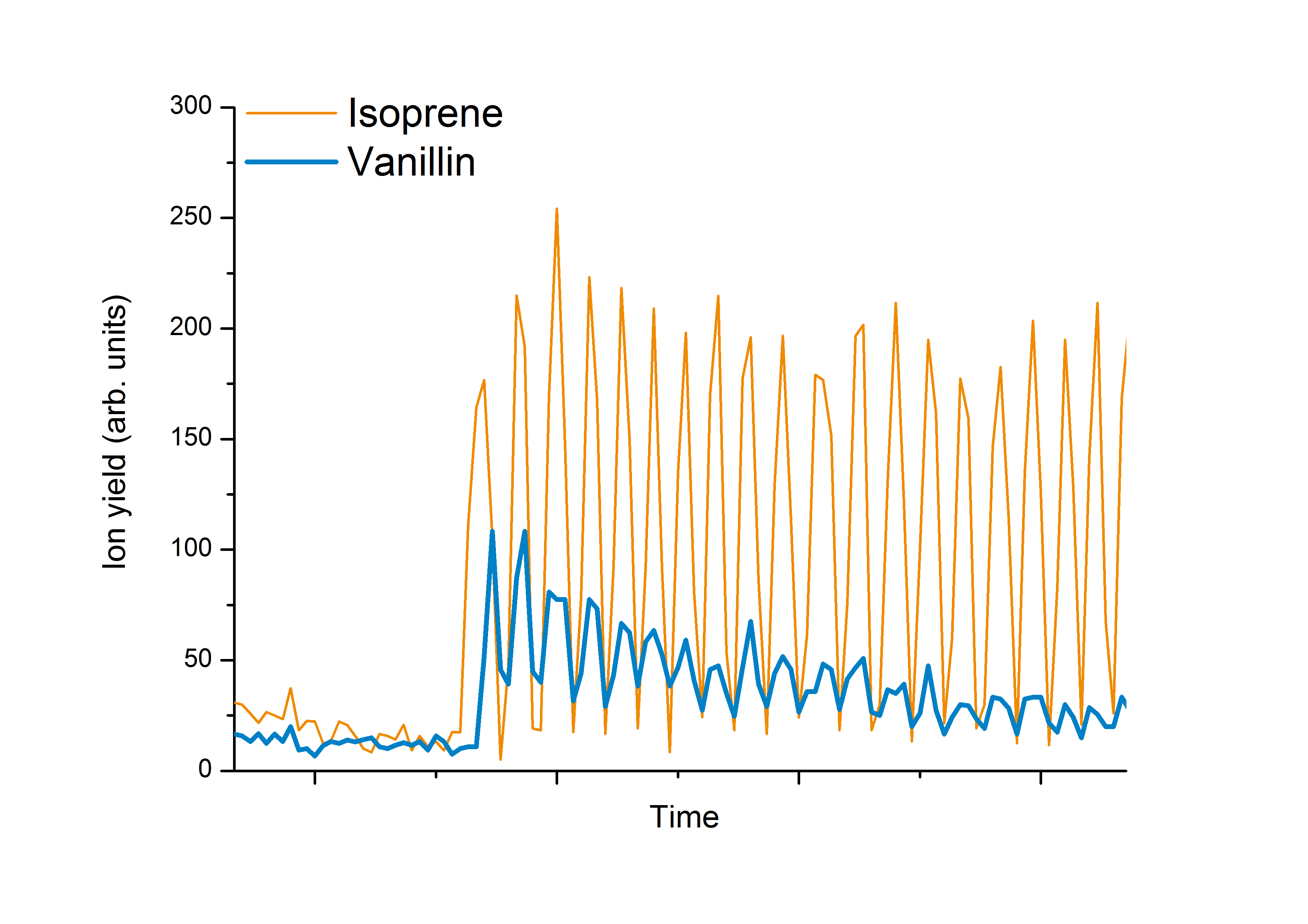
Fig. 2: PTR-MS measurement of vanillin dissemination in human breath. Isoprene is a product of human metabolism and acts as an indicator for breath cycles. (The measurement was performed utilizing a "N.A.S.E." inlet system coupled to a "HS PTR-MS".)

Fig. 2 shows a typical PTR-MS measurement performed in food and flavor research. The test person swallows a sip of a vanillin flavored drink and breathes via his nose into a heated inlet device coupled to a PTR-MS instrument. Due to the high time resolution and sensitivity of the instrument used here, the development of vanillin in the person's breath can be monitored in real-time (please note that isoprene is shown in this figure because it is a product of human metabolism and therefore acts as an indicator for the breath cycles). The data can be used for food design, i.e. for adjusting the intensity and duration of vanillin flavor tasted by the consumer.

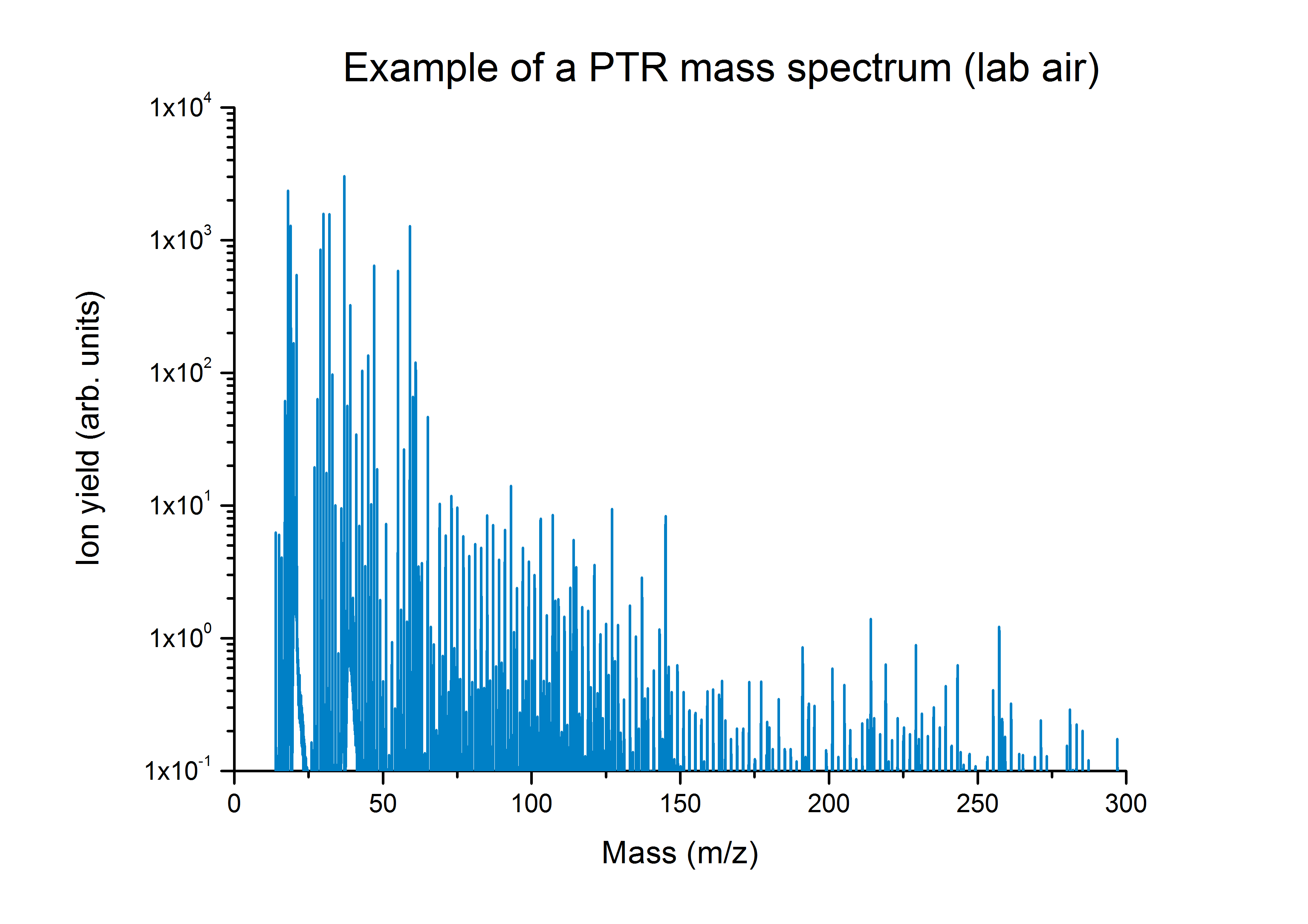
Fig. 3: PTR mass spectrum of laboratory air obtained using a TOF based PTR instrument.

Another example for the application of PTR-MS in food science was published in 2008 by C. Lindinger et al. in Analytical Chemistry. This publication found great response even in non-scientific media. Lindinger et al. developed a method to convert "dry" data from a PTR-MS instrument that measured headspace air from different coffee samples into expressions of flavor (e.g. "woody", "winey", "flowery", etc.) and showed that the obtained flavor profiles matched nicely to the ones created by a panel of European coffee tasting experts.

=== Air quality analysis ===
In Fig. 3 a mass spectrum of air inside a laboratory (obtained with a time-of-flight (TOF) based PTR-MS instrument), is shown. The peaks on m/z 19, 37 and 55 (and their isotopes) represent the reagent ions (H_{3}O^{+}) and their clusters. On m/z 30 and 32 NO^{+} and O_{2}^{+}, which are both impurities originating from the ion source, appear. All other peaks correspond to compounds present in typical laboratory air (e.g. high intensity of protonated acetone on m/z 59). If one takes into account that virtually all peaks visible in Fig. 3 are in fact double, triple or multiple peaks (isobaric compounds) it becomes obvious that for PTR-MS instruments selectivity is at least as important as sensitivity, especially when complex samples / compositions are analyzed. One methods for improving the selectivity is high mass resolution. When the PTR source is coupled to a high resolution mass spectrometer isobaric compounds can be distinguished and substances can be identified via their exact mass. Some PTR-MS instruments are, despite the lack of a mass filter between the ion source and the drift tube, capable of switching the reagent ions (e.g. to NO^{+} or O_{2}^{+}). With the additional information obtained by using different reagent ions a much higher level of selectivity can be reached, e.g. some isomeric molecules can be distinguished.

== See also ==
- Chemical ionization
- Gas analysis
- Mass Spectrometry
- Selected-ion flow-tube mass spectrometry
- Secondary electrospray ionization
