= Exhaled nitric oxide =

Breath test for respiratory inflammation

Chemical formula of nitric oxide (NO) together with its molecular size (115 pm).

In medicine, exhaled nitric oxide (eNO - now commonly known as FeNO) can be measured in a breath test for asthma and other respiratory conditions characterized by airway inflammation. Nitric oxide (NO) is a gaseous molecule produced by certain cell types in an inflammatory response. The fraction of exhaled NO (FE_{NO}) is a promising biomarker for the diagnosis, follow-up and as a guide to therapy in adults and children with asthma. The breath test has recently become available in many well-equipped hospitals in developed countries, although its exact role remains unclear.

== Biology ==
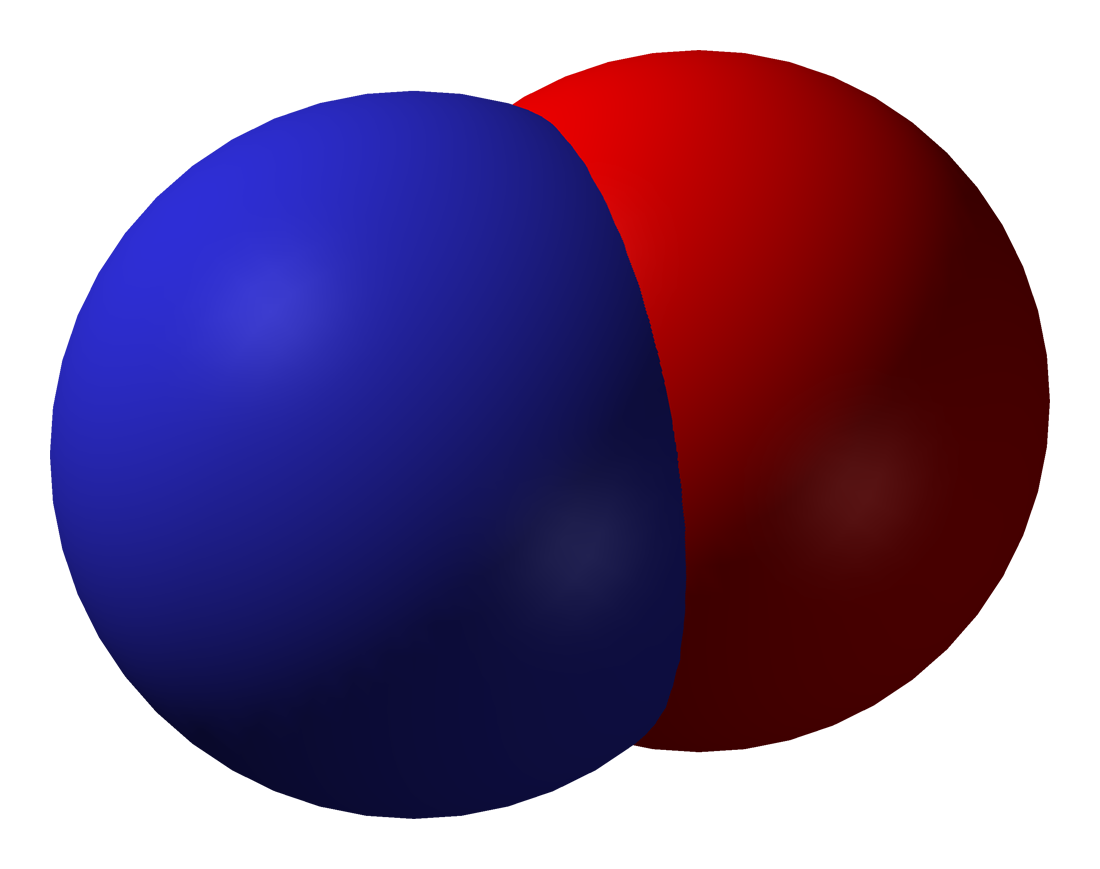
Three-dimensional model of NO.

In humans, nitric oxide is produced from L-arginine by three enzymes called nitric oxide synthases (NOS): inducible (iNOS), endothelial (eNOS), and neuronal (nNOS). The latter two are constantly active in endothelial cells and neurons respectively, whereas iNOS' action can be induced in states like inflammation (for example, by cytokines). In inflammation, several cells use iNOS to produce NO, including eosinophils. As such, eNO (also known as FeNO "fractional exhaled nitric oxide") has been dubbed an inflammometer.

Although iNOS is thought to be the main contributor to exhaled NO in asthmatics, studies in mice also point to a role for nNOS.

It was initially thought that exhaled NO derived mostly from the sinuses, which contain high levels of NO. It has subsequently been shown that the lower airways contribute most of the exhaled NO, and that contamination from the sinuses is minimal.

== Medical use ==
=== Asthma ===
Patients with asthma have higher eNO levels than other people. Their levels also rise together with other clinical and laboratory parameters of asthma (for example, the amount of eosinophils in their sputum). In conditions that trigger inflammation such as upper respiratory tract infections or the inhalation of allergens or plicatic acid, eNO levels rise. The eNO levels also tend to vary according to the results of lung function test results such as the degree of bronchial hyperresponsiveness. Furthermore, drugs used to treat asthma (such as inhaled glucocorticoids or leukotriene receptor antagonists) also reduce eNO levels.

Clinical trials have looked at whether tailoring asthma therapy based on eNO values is better than conventional care, in which therapy is gauged by symptoms and the results of lung function tests. To date, the results in both adults and children have been modest and this technique can not be universally recommended. It has also been noted that factors other than inflammation can increase eNO levels, for example airway acidity.

The fraction of eNO has been found to be a better test to identify asthmatics than basic lung function testing (for airway obstruction). Its specificity is comparable to bronchial challenge testing, although less sensitive. This means that a positive eNO test might be useful to rule in a diagnosis of asthma; however, a negative test might not be as useful to rule it out.

== Other conditions ==
The role for eNO in other conditions is even less well established compared to asthma.

Since asthma can be a cause of chronic coughing (it may even be the sole manifestation, such as in cough-variant asthma), studies have looked at whether eNO can be used in the diagnosis of chronic cough.

Exhaled NO is minimally increased in chronic obstructive pulmonary disease, but levels may rise in sudden worsenings of the disease (acute exacerbations) or disease progression. Early findings indicate a possible role for eNO in predicting the response to inhaled glucocorticoids and the degree of airway obstruction reversibility.

Children with cystic fibrosis have been found to have low eNO levels. In subjects with bronchiectasis (a state of localized, irreversible dilatation of part of the bronchial tree) not due to cystic fibrosis, high levels have been found. Sarcoidosis could also feature increased eNO. Low levels have been found in primary ciliary dyskinesia, bronchopulmonary dysplasia, and pulmonary arterial hypertension. In the latter condition, inhaled NO is used as a diagnostic test of the response of the pulmonary arteries to vasodilators (agents that relax the blood vessels).

eNO has also been associated with wheeze, rhinitis and nasal allergy in primary school children.

Exposure to air pollution has been associated with decreased, and increased eNO levels.

== Measurement techniques ==
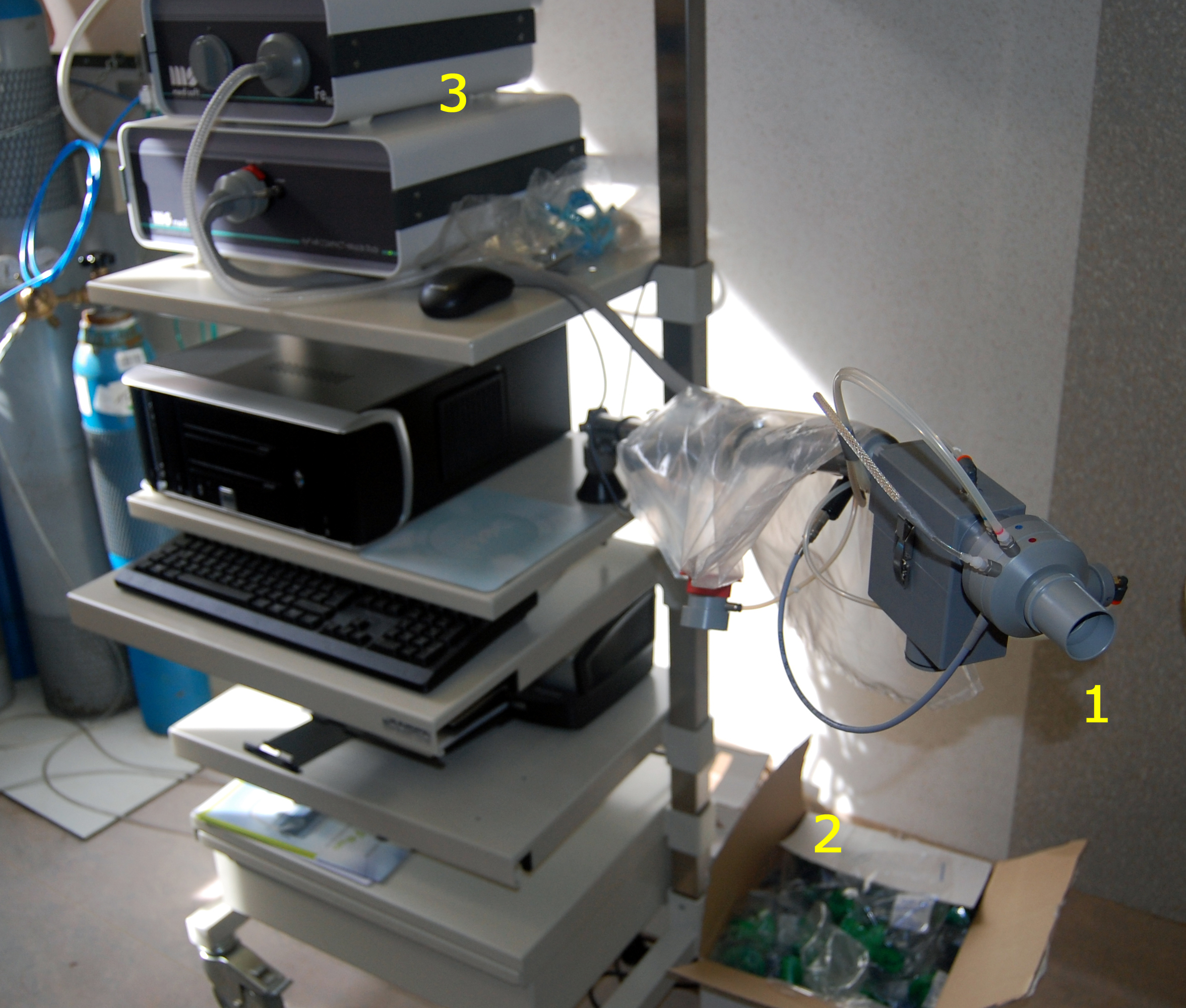
An experimental setup used to measure the fraction of exhaled nitric oxide (FeNO) in human breath samples. The subject blows into the tube (1) after a mouthpiece (2) has been connected to it. The wires on the side are part of the system that measures parameters like breath velocity, while the exhaled gas is taken to a FeNO analyzer (3).

In the early days of eNO, the most common technique was to measure eNO is with a chemical reaction that produces light; this is called a chemiluminescence reaction. The NO in the breath sample reacts with ozone to form nitrogen dioxide in an excited state. When this returns to its ground state, it emits light in quantities that are proportional to the amount of exhaled NO.

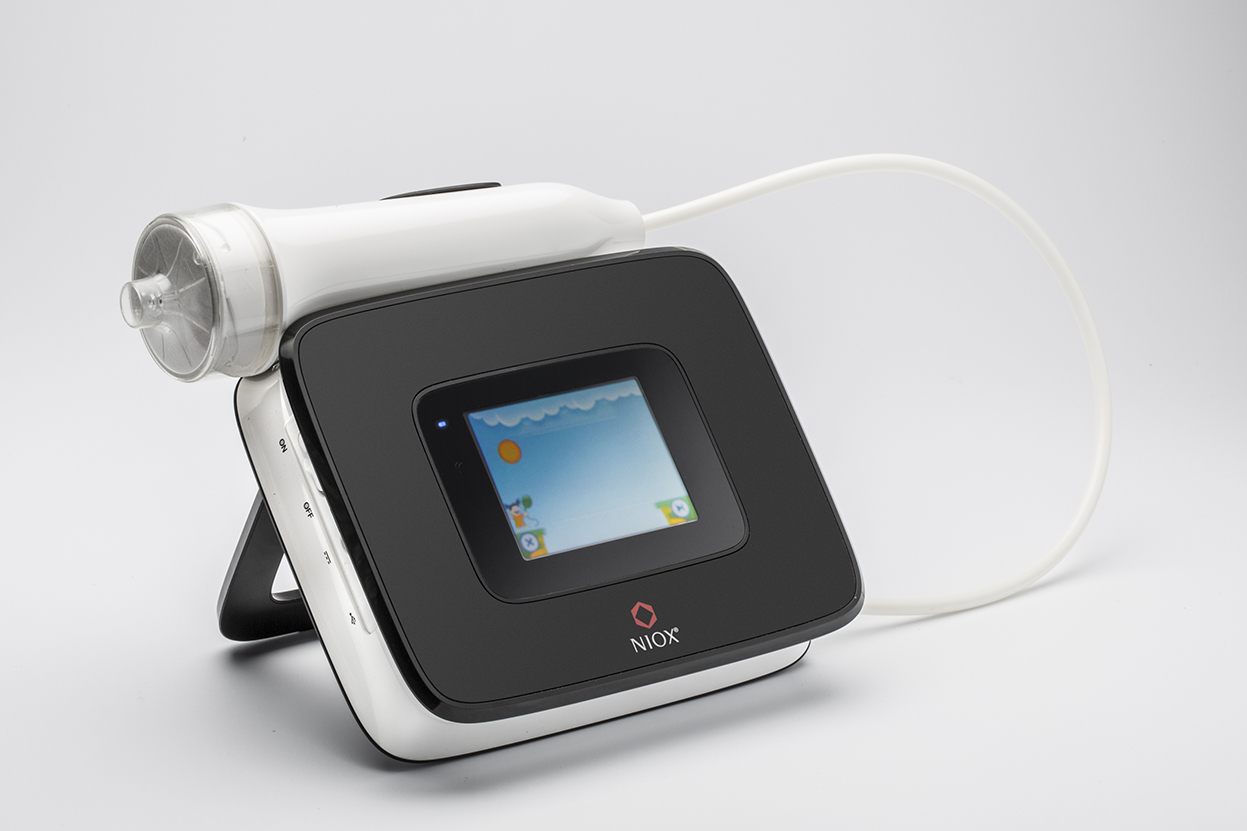
NIOX VERO® medical device for measurement of exhaled nitric oxide

The subject can exhale directly into a measurement device ('online' technique), or into a reservoir that can afterwards be connected to the analyser ('offline' technique). With the former technique, the early and later NO in the breath sample can be analysed separately. The test requires little coordination from the subject, and children older than 4 can be tested successfully.

The National Institute of Clinical Excellence (NICE) in the UK have published guidance on available measuring devices: https://www.nice.org.uk/guidance/dg12

In today's world, many portable and point-of-care FeNO analyzers instead use an electrochemical sensor, in which nitric oxide is oxidized at an electrode and the resulting current is proportional to the NO concentration in the sample. Electrochemical devices are smaller, cheaper and require less maintenance and operator training than chemiluminescence analyzers, which are comparatively bulky and costly, making electrochemical analyzers more practical in primary care and community settings.

Electrochemical and chemiluminescence analyzers generally correlate well, but they do not necessarily produce interchangeable values. Comparison studies have reported significant correlation with only moderate agreement between hand-held electrochemical devices and stationary chemiluminescence analyzers, with the electrochemical devices tending to read lower. Because of these inter-device differences, results are best interpreted with reference to the specific analyzer used, and serial measurements in the same patient should ideally be made with the same device.

Laser-based approaches, such as quantum cascade laser absorption spectroscopy, have also been investigated and show clinically acceptable agreement with both methods, but high cost and limited commercial availability have restricted their adoption.

== Reference range ==
The upper normal level of eNO in different studies ranges from 20 to 30 parts per billion. However, several major features influence the reference values. Men have higher eNO values than women. Smoking notoriously lowers eNO values, and even former smoking status can influence results. The levels are higher in people with an atopic constitution (a tendency towards allergies). The fraction of eNO is also flow-dependent (higher at lower flow rates and vice versa), so measurements are normally measured at 50 ml/s. Age or height could also considerably confound eNO values in children. The magnitude of these effects lies in the order of 10%, so even single cut-off values might be useful.

== History ==
Until the 1980s, nitric oxide, a product of fossil fuel combustion, was thought only to play a role the detrimental effects of air pollution on the respiratory tract. In 1987, experiments with coronary arteries showed that nitric oxide was the long sought endothelium-derived relaxing factor. After scientists realised that NO played a biological role, its role as a cell signalling molecule and neurotransmitter became clear from abundant studies.

NO was first detected in exhaled breath samples in 1991. In 1992, NO was voted molecule of the year by the scientific journal Science. In 1993, researchers from the Karolinska Institute in Sweden were the first to report increased eNO in asthmatics.

The first commercial FeNO testing device was developed in 1998 by the Swedish company Aerocrine AB, which is now a part of the NIOX Group of companies.

Today, NO is not only used in breath tests but also as a therapeutic agent for conditions such as pulmonary arterial hypertension and possibly for the acute respiratory distress syndrome.
