= Chemiluminescent immunoassay =

Biochemical test

Chemiluminescence immunoassay (CLIA) is a type of immunoassay that uses chemiluminescence (CL) to determine the concentration of an analyte. This is achieved through the addition of a luminophore or enzyme marker to the antibody, allowing it to form an immune complex with the target antigen. The addition of a luminescent substrate results in a chemical reaction that produces chemiluminescence. The intensity of emitted light corresponds to the concentration of the analyte.

This process is used in clinical diagnostics as well as food and environmental analysis due to its high specificity and ability to detect low concentrations. CLIA is still being improved with research in nanoparticles and ways to improve its efficiency and accuracy.

== History ==
Immunoassays were first used in 1959 with the creation of competitive radioimmunoassay for the detection of insulin. This development enabled the creation of later types of immunoassays used today.

This method of immunoassay depended on the use of polyclonal antibodies which were limited in supply. In 1975, monoclonal antibody production was first recorded. This would increase the accessibility of antibodies for use in testing, helping to develop non-competitive immunoassays often referred to as sandwich immunoassays due to their use of two antibodies.

Another hurdle in the development of effective immunoassays was label sensitivity. Radioisotopes, while highly specific, posed safety concerns and other labels such as fluorophores or enzymes were not as sensitive. This led to the discovery of chemiluminescence as a labeling method in 1976 that was improved over the years to be an effective substitute. It was both a safer alternative and had higher sensitivity than radioisotopes. As a result, it is a commonly used technique in immunoassays today.

== Method ==
CLIA is a technique that utilizes CL and the interaction between antigens and antibodies. When bound together, they form an immune complex which allows the concentration of a specific analyte, the biomolecule being measured, to be determined.

There are two methods for performing CLIA, direct and enzyme-amplified. The direct method involves the use of luminophore markers to label the antibody directly. These markers are usually acridinium esters. The more common method for CLIA, however, is indirect where enzymatic markers are used. The most common enzyme used is horseradish peroxidase (HRP) which is conjugated with the antibody. A chemiluminescent substrate, commonly luminol or isoluminol, is then added to the sample.

The resulting exergonic chemical reactions from both methods generate light through luminescence which occurs when electrons transition from the excited to ground state. The intensity of the resulting light is then used to determine the concentration of the analyte in the sample. This is measured using relative light units (RLUs) which are converted using a calibration curve for concentration measurements.

While antibodies are still used in CLIA, the use of aptamers have started to become more widespread. The cheaper production, easier modification, and stability of aptamers enable them to be used in place of antibodies. These synthetic, single-stranded DNA or RNA molecules act similarly to antibodies and are able to bind with high specificity to target molecules.

=== Enhancers ===
Because the emission of light during CLIA can be instantaneous, chemical enhancers are often added to the system which boosts electron activation and sensitivity. The use of p-iodophenol (PIP) was most commonly used until being replaced by other phenol compounds due to its odor. Bromophenol blue and phenolphthalein are some examples of alternatives shown to enhance chemiluminescence signal. The use of chemical enhancers, while providing improved sensitivity, are also unstable and can cause background interference. As a result, the development of enhancers with less interference is a goal of future research in CLIA.

=== Additional types of CLIA ===
CLIA has been combined with other techniques such as flow-injection analysis (FIA) and lateral flow immunoassays (LFIA). The combination between FIA and CLIA (FIA-CL) is advantageous for automation of the analysis process. The speed of the analysis is increased with high specificity and lower consumption of reagents. For CL-LFIA, the chemiluminescent substrates, along with enhancers, are added to a sample pad after the sample solution and flow to the test line. The reaction of the enzyme-labeled antibody at the test line results in chemiluminescence. There are two different types of CL-LFIA, sandwich and competitive. In the sandwich immunoassay, the light emitted is positively correlated with the amount of analyte present. In the competitive immunoassay, the analyte competes with the antibody for binding, causing reduced light emittance to correlate with higher concentration of analytes.

== Applications ==
CLIA and its combination with other techniques have a wide range of uses in testing which include diagnostics as well as drug and environmental analysis.

=== Clinical diagnosis ===
The purpose of determining antibody concentration through CLIA is often used to test for diseases, an important application for this is in the diagnosis of autoimmune diseases like rheumatoid arthritis or coeliac disease. Due to the progressive nature of these conditions, early detection is both crucial and difficult. With the use of automated CLIA, which has the ability to determine antibody concentration at extremely low limits, it creates the ability for detection before the condition has become too severe. This improves the ability to implement treatment methods. CLIA can also be used in the detection of parasitic disease such as toxoplasmosis. Detection of infection by toxoplasma gondii (T. gondii) is important for treatment of the condition. CLIA is used, in this case, to test for the presence of immunoglobulin G (IgG) antibodies specific to T. gondii. It has been proven effective in the diagnosis of toxoplasmosis in humans due again to its ability to detect at low concentrations with its use in testing in animals still being improved.

=== Food and environmental safety ===
Besides its clinical uses, CL combined with FIA can also be used to determine the contents of food and to monitor the environment. In food, FIA-CL is used for the detection of antioxidants, natural compounds, potential contaminants, and more. One example is the determination of sugars where flow-based CL has been able to simultaneously test for glucose, fructose and lactose. This is done by observing the reaction of the sugars with luminol-potassium ferricyanide. An example for antioxidants is gallic acid which can be found in plants. FIA-CL can monitor its presence in a luminol-potassium permanganate system as gallic acid acts as an inhibitor of chemiluminescence emission. Due to its specificity, FIA-CL can also be used to look for trace amounts of contaminants found in food with the example of Sudan dyes, illegal carcinogenic food colorants, acting as an enhancer of CL in luminol-hydrogen peroxide systems.

In environmental analysis, FIA-CL is used to monitor water for inorganic or organic compounds and pesticides. One example for the testing of metals is Fe(II) and Fe(III). Fe(II) can be determined based on its catalyzing effect on the reaction of luminol and dioxygen or hydrogen peroxide. To determine total iron concentration, seawater was treated with sodium sulfite and then run through a FIA system, converting Fe(III) to Fe(II). Organic pollutants such as phenols can also be determined due to their ability to inhibit CL in N-Chlorosuccinimide-KI-luminol systems. Pesticides can be tested for using FIA-CL with one example being carbofuran. It enhances CL emission in luminol-potassium permanganate reactions, allowing for its presence to be monitored.

== Recent developments ==
CLIA is still being researched for ways to improve its speed, accuracy, and sensitivity. One advancement in CLIA method is the use of nanomaterials as labels. Their high surface-volume ratio and ability to act as catalysts makes them a viable strategy to enhance the signal and intensity of luminol systems for CLIA. Gold nanoparticles (AuNPs) have been used to allow for homogeneous CLIA as opposed to a heterogeneous format, which requires the separation of the analyte, while also maintaining high sensitivity. A recent 2024 study looked at graphene oxide (GO), a carbon-based nanomaterial that is useful due to its conductivity and ability to interact with other molecules, and how it can be combined with AuNPs. The results of this study found that combining GOs with AuNPs and luminol enhanced chemiluminescence and prolonged the light emission.

Magnetic nanoparticles (MNPs) have also been used in CLIA which accelerates the separation process, allowing for improved automation. The properties of the magnetic beads used in magnetic CLIA (MCLIA), such as charge and hydrophobicity are crucial for the chemical linkage to the antibody. Due to this, a 2025 study looked at ways to fabricate beads with the addition of amino acids (MPS-GA), finding that it generated a strong chemiluminescence signal and reduced background interference.

== See also ==
- Enzyme-linked immunosorbent assay (ELISA)
