= LiMAx test =

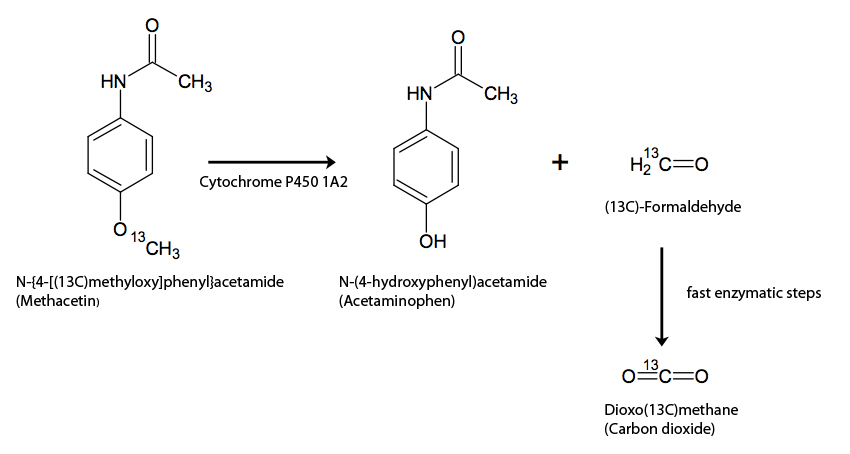
- Figure 1: Methacetin is metabolized by the hepatic cytochrome P450 1A2 specific to acetaminophen and ^{13}C-formaldehyde, which is then converted in several fast enzymatic steps to ^{13}CO_{2}
- Purpose: liver function test

The LiMAx test (maximum liver function capacity) is a dynamic liver function test based on the metabolism of ^{13}C-methacetin by the liver-specific cytochrome P450 1A2 system. The test can be carried out at bedside displaying actual liver function at the point of measurement (Point-of-care testing).

== Test principle ==
The LiMAx test is an innovative enzymatic liver function test. ^{13}C-methacetin, a selective metabolite of the liver specific cytochrome P450 1A2 is administered intravenously. Via the bloodstream the drug is transported to the liver and immediately metabolized to paracetamol and ultimately to ^{13}CO_{2} (Fig. 1), which is in turn transported via the bloodstream to the lung and exhaled.

Cytochrome P450 1A2 is evenly distributed over all the cells of a liver acinus, and is in contrast to other members of the cytochrome P450 family exclusively expressed in the liver. Cytochrome P450 A2 is usually not inducible by clinically frequently used drugs making it ideal even in complex clinical situations (exceptions are oral contraceptives resulting in a strong induction of P450 A2). Nutrition and lifestyle can strongly influence P450 A2 induction e.g. smoking or coffee consumption.

The test substance ^{13}C methacetin itself is considered non-toxic and very well tolerated in the used dosage. Similarly, ^{13}C is a stable, naturally occurring and non-radioactive carbon isotope. For this reason, patients need to fast for at least three hours before measurement to remove potential interferences with carbon from the food.

== Test procedure ==
The test is started with placing a breathing mask on the patient's face, separating the inhaled from the exhaled air by two valves. Consequently, the ratio of the ^{13}CO_{2}/^{12}CO_{2} is determined in the exhaled air over a period of 10 to 20 minutes to measure the individual baseline of each patient (Fig. 2).

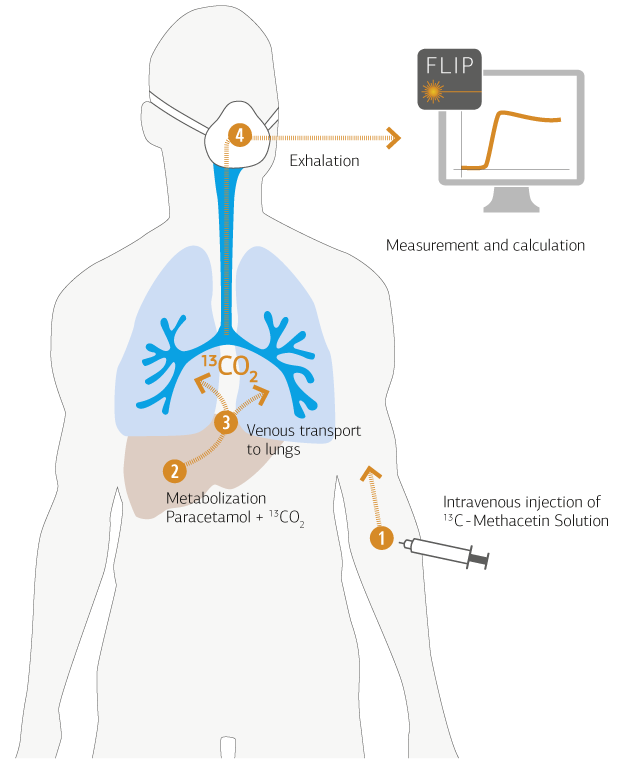
Figure 2: Individual liver function can be assessed by continuous measurement of ^{13}CO_{2}/^{12}CO_{2}-Ratio after injection und metabolism of ^{13}C-methacetin.

After intravenous injection of ^{13}C-methacetin the ratio of ^{13}CO_{2}/^{12}CO_{2} increases subsequently and is quantified by a special device continuously and realtime at the bedside (FLIP). Since the device is detecting the carbon dioxide ratio chronic lung diseases (e.g. COPD, fibrosis) do not influence test results. The turnover of ^{13}C-methacetin can be continuously determined using kinetic analysis. The LiMAx (maximum liver function capacity) is defined as the maximum value of the substrate conversion normalized to body weight.

== Clinical application ==
The LiMAx test was developed at Charité University Hospital Berlin and is deployed in German, Austrian and Swiss university hospitals gaining widespread use in hepatology and liver surgery. Stockmann et al. could show that LiMAx is an excellent predictor of postoperative liver failure after partial hepatic resection. Moreover, Lock et al. showed that the onset and course of liver regeneration after liver surgery could be validly displayed using LiMAx. In the context of liver transplantation LiMAx demonstrated high diagnostic accuracy in detecting early transplant dysfunction or non-function of liver grafts allowing an appropriate clinical management.

Similarly, present liver cirrhosis can be diagnosed adequately by means of the LiMAx test and graded according to the functional impairment. Present research on LiMAx test addresses the non-invasive diagnosis of liver cirrhosis, the influence of chemotherapy on liver function and liver function adapted drug therapy as well as other issues in hepatology and surgery.
