= Orsat gas analyser =

Piece of laboratory equipment

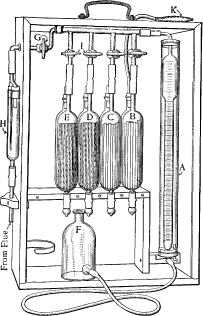
ORSAT analyzer

An Orsat gas analyser or Orsat apparatus is a piece of laboratory equipment used to analyse a gas sample (typically fossil fuel flue gas) for its oxygen, carbon monoxide and carbon dioxide content. Although largely replaced by instrumental techniques, the Orsat remains a reliable method of measurement and is relatively simple to use.

The apparatus was invented by Louis Orsat who reported it in the Annales des Mines in 1875. There was an earlier report by Thomas Egleston in 1873.

== Construction ==
The apparatus consists of an intake valve which feeds into a calibrated water or glycerin jacketed gas burette, this burette is then connected by tubing to two or more absorption pipettes containing chemical solutions that absorb the gases it is being used to measure. The intake and each of the absorption pipettes are valved with stopcocks to allow the movement of gas through the apparatus to be precisely controlled. For safety and portability, the apparatus is usually encased in a wooden box with a handle.

The most common absorbents are:

- Potassium hydroxide (caustic potash) for carbon dioxide
- Pyrogallol (pyrogallic acid) for oxygen
- Copper(I) chloride (ammoniacal Cuprous chloride) for carbon monoxide

Any left-over gas is assumed to be nitrogen, though other absorbents or vessels can be used to isolate additional gases. Platinum on asbestos for example can be used to determine the hydrogen content of a sample, and the Fischer-type Orsat gas analyser for example uses a platinum electrode to explode the remaining gases with hydrogen.

The base of the gas burette is connected to a leveling bottle which typically contains slightly acidulated water with a trace of chemical indicator (typically methyl orange) for colouration. The small amount of acid added to the water reduces the solubility of carbon dioxide. The leveling bottle can be lifted and lowered to enable readings to be taken at constant pressure and to transfer the gas to and from the pipettes containing the different absorption media. The movement of gas through the apparatus is entirely controlled using the leveling bottle and the various stopcocks.

== Method of analysis ==
By means of a rubber tubing arrangement, the gas to be analyzed is drawn into the burette and flushed through several times. Using the stopcocks to isolate the absorption pipettes 100ml is typically withdrawn into the main burette for ease of calculation and the leveling flask is raised until the water is level between it and the burette. This insures that the sample is of a known volume and is in equilibrium with the pressure of the room. The water or glycerin jacket further assures that the sample is kept at room temperature.

The gas is then passed into the Potassium Hydroxide (caustic potash) burette by opening the stop cock and lifting the leveling flask. This siphons water into the burette which pushes the gas into the absorption vessel. The gas is left to stand for about two minutes and then withdrawn, isolating the remaining gas via the stopcock arrangements. The process is then repeated to ensure full absorption. Afterward the leveling flask is once more adjusted until the fluid level is equal between both vessels and a measurement of the new gas volume is taken. If 100ml of gas was present initially the new volume indicates the percentage of carbon dioxide absorbed. If a sample after absorption contained 88ml of gas, then it would be recorded as 12% carbon dioxide.

The same technique is repeated for oxygen, using the pyrogallol, and carbon monoxide using the ammoniacal cuprous chloride though depending on any additional absorption media the process may be different. Potassium Hydroxide for example will also absorb sulfur dioxide, and so the step to measure SO2 would need to come first.

Other types

- Orsat-Aimer Products Orsat apparatus
- Orsat-Fischer apparatus
- Orsat-Lunge apparatus
- Orsat-Friedrichs apparatus
- Sona Orsat apparatus
- Fischer type Orsat gas analyser
