= Portable toilet =

Toilet that is easily moved around

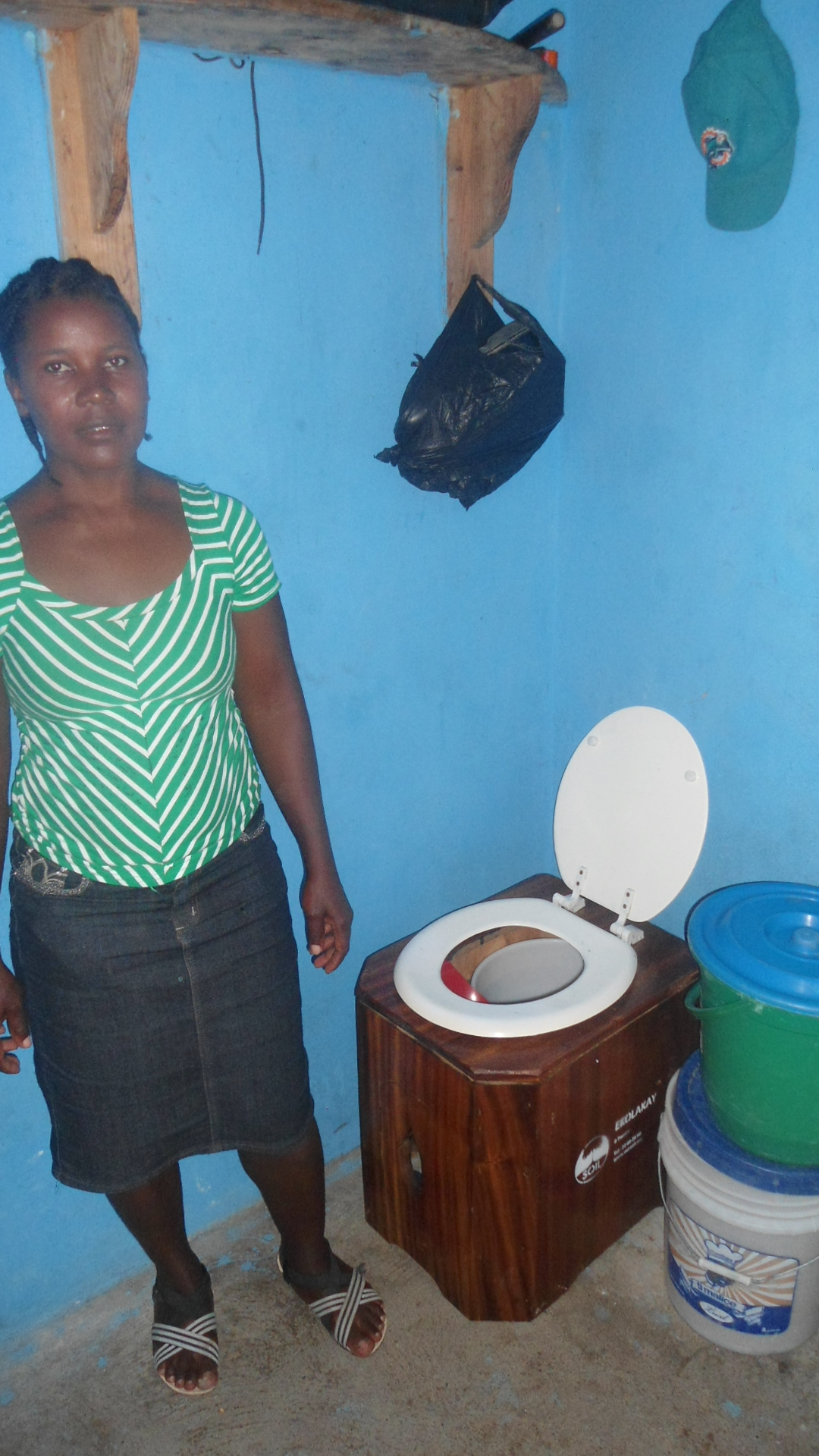
A portable urine-diverting dry toilet, marketed in Haiti by Sustainable Organic Integrated Livelihoods under the name "EkoLakay"

A portable or mobile toilet (colloquial terms: thunderbox, porta-john, porta-potty or porta-loo) is any type of toilet that can be moved around, some by one person, some by mechanical equipment such as a truck and crane. Most types do not require any pre-existing services or infrastructure, such as sewerage, and are completely self-contained. The portable toilet is used in a variety of situations, for example in urban slums of developing countries, at festivals, for camping, on boats, on construction sites, and at film locations and large outdoor gatherings where there are no other facilities. Most portable toilets are unisex single units with privacy ensured by a simple lock on the door. Some portable toilets are small molded plastic or fiberglass portable rooms with a lockable door and a receptacle to catch the human excreta in a container.

A portable toilet is not connected to a hole in the ground (like a pit latrine), nor to a septic tank, nor is it plumbed into a municipal system leading to a sewage treatment plant. The chemical toilet is probably the most well-known type of portable toilet, but other types also exist, such as urine-diversion dehydration toilets, composting toilets, container-based toilets, bucket toilets, freezing toilets and incineration toilets. A bucket toilet is a very simple type of portable toilet.

== Types ==
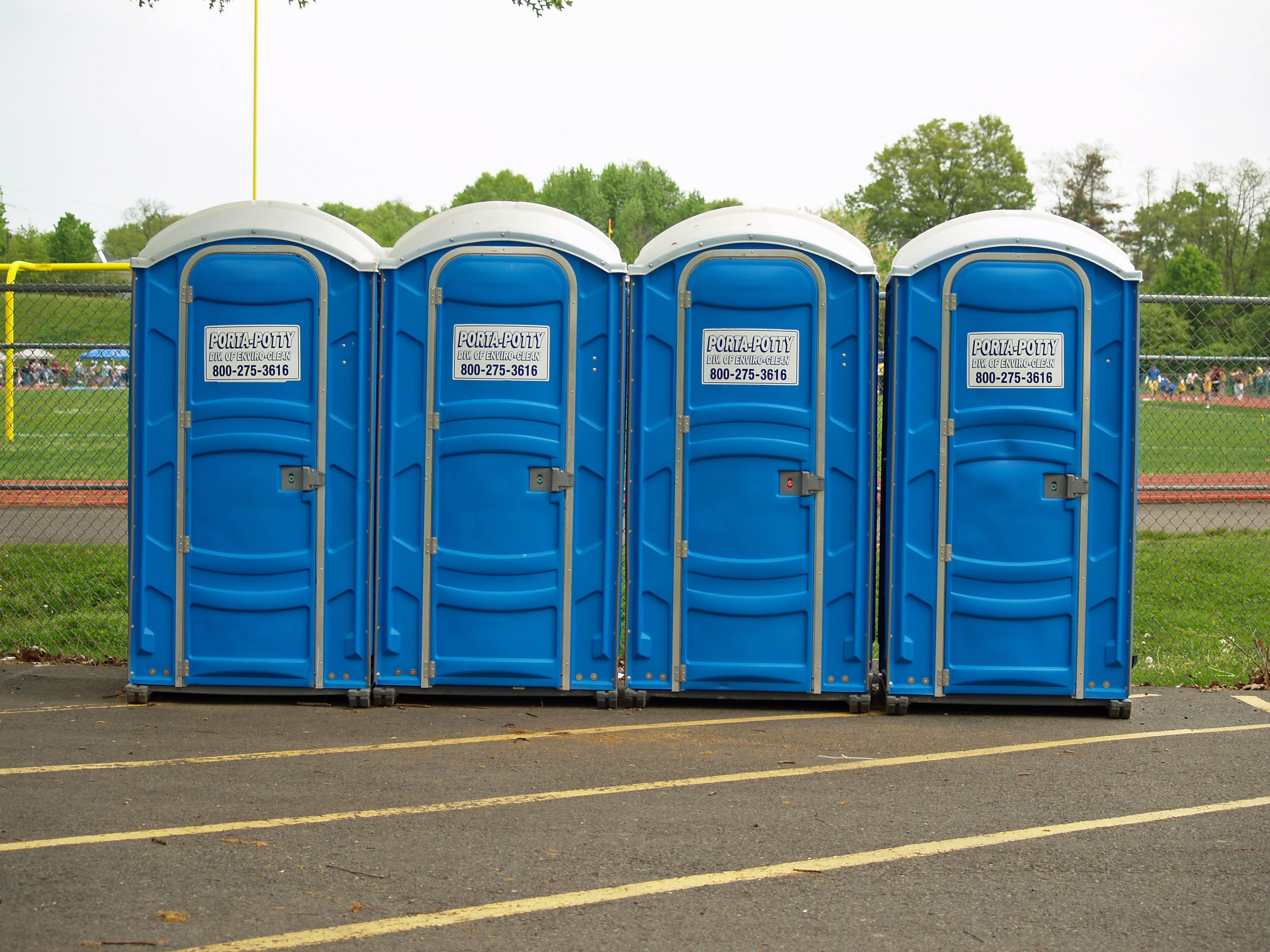
A line of blue plastic portable chemical toilets

=== Chemical toilets ===
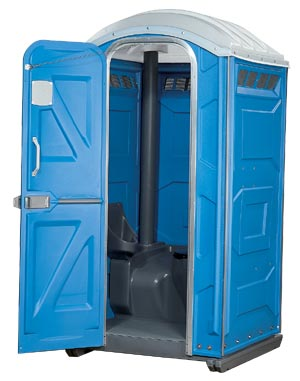
Plastic-moulded outdoor cubicle, commonly used for chemical toilets at building sites and festivals

A chemical toilet collects human waste in a holding tank and uses chemicals to minimize the odors. Most portable toilets use chemicals in this way and therefore are considered chemical toilets. The chemicals may either mask the odor or contain biocides that hinder odor-causing bacteria from multiplying, keeping the smell to a minimum.

==== Enclosed portable toilets ====
Enclosed portable chemical toilets are widely used for crowds at festivals, and for worksites without permanent toilets, such as early stages of construction and remote worksites.

==== Portable camping toilets ====
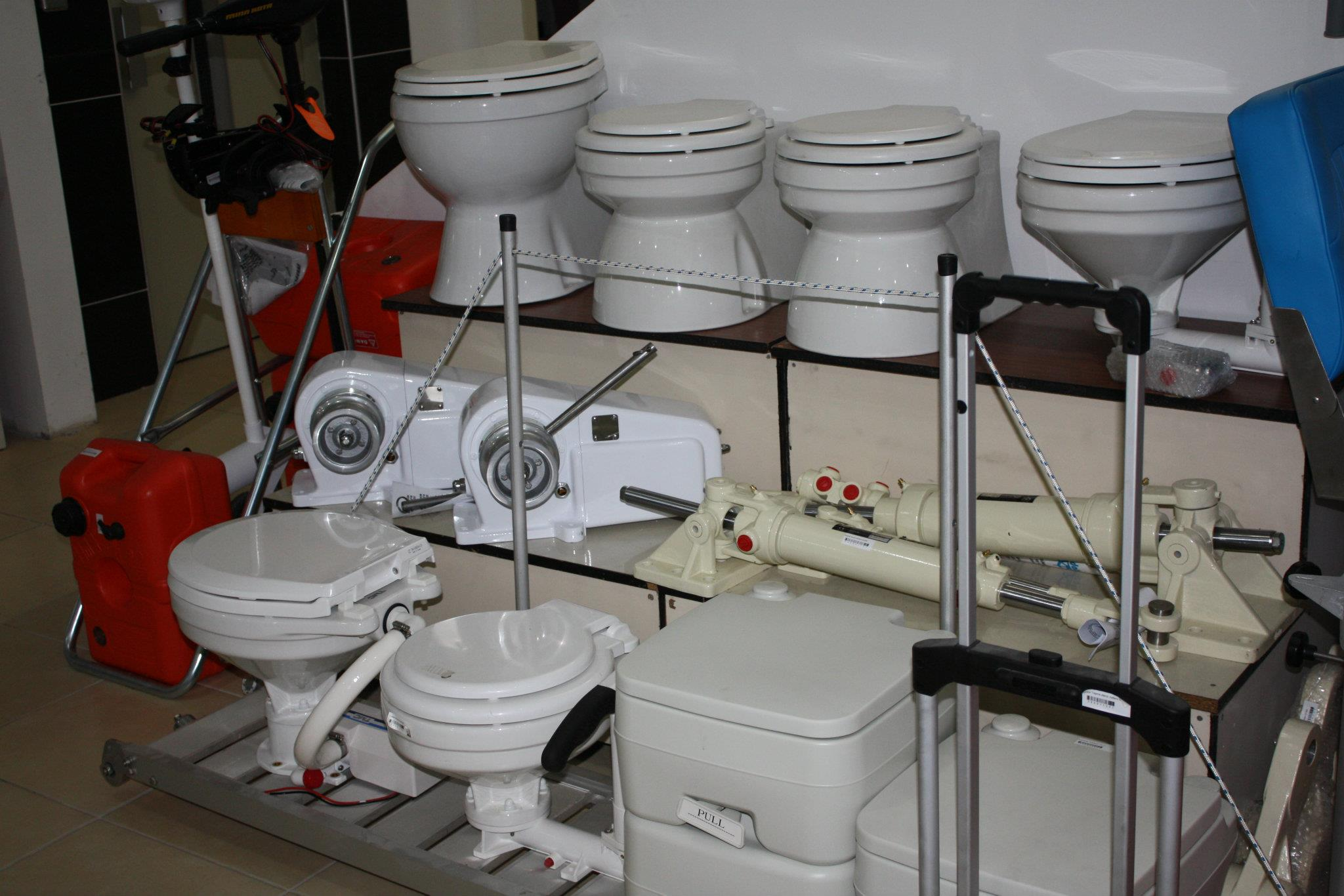
Various boat toilets, including the most basic models on the bottom right

A portable camping toilet has a seat and a small waste tank. Adding a packet of chemicals to the waste tank reduces odors and bacteria, until the waste can be dumped at an appropriate facility. They are used in camping, travel trailers, caravans, and camper vans. They may also be used on small boats which lack a built-in marine toilet.

==== WAG bags ====
Waste aggregation and gelling (WAG) bags have a gel to immobilize liquid waste and surround solid waste in a plastic bag, which is then put in the trash. They are used in the US Army and in wilderness. They can be used to line a bucket, with a toilet-seat lid, and are required for Utah river trips.

=== Urine-diversion dehydration toilets ===
Portable urine-diversion dehydration toilets are self-contained dry toilets sometimes referred to as "mobile" or "stand-alone" units. They are identifiable by their one-piece molded plastic shells or, in the case of DIY versions, simple plywood box construction. Most users of self-contained UDDTs rely upon a collection agency or a post-treatment process to ensure pathogen reduction. This post-treatment may consist of long-term storage or addition to an existing or purpose-built compost pile or some combination thereof. The necessity of a post-treatment step hinges upon the frequency and volume of use. For instances of infrequent or very modest seasonal use, a post-treatment phase might be deemed unnecessary due to the lower accumulation of waste, simplifying the overall disposal process.

Container-based sanitation refers to a collection system which regularly replaces full containers with empty containers, and disposes of the waste.

=== Commode chair ===
A commode chair (a chair enclosing a chamber pot) is a basic portable toilet that is used next to a bed (bedside commode) for people with limited mobility. Before indoor toilets, it was used world-wide as an indoor alternative to an outhouse.

== History ==
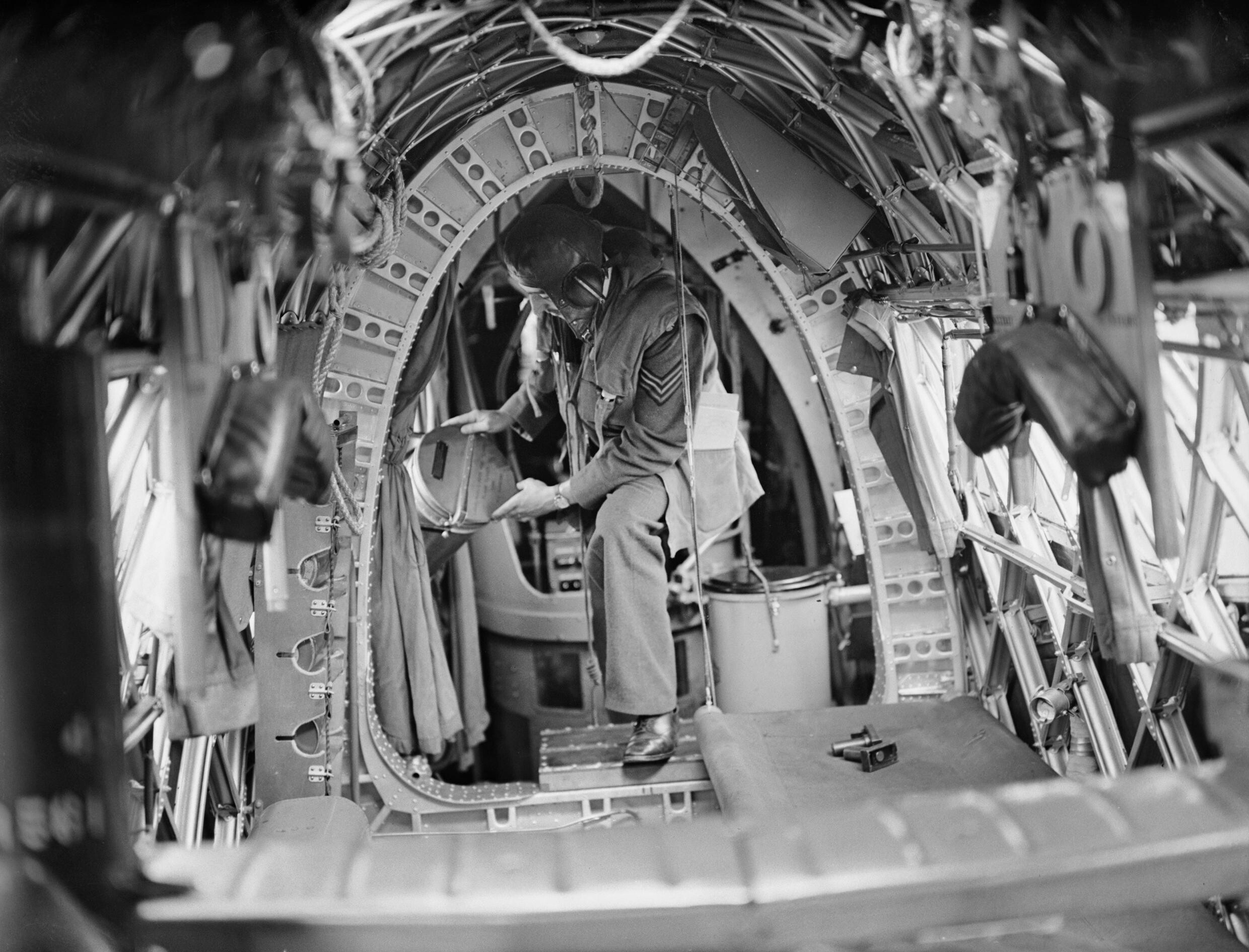
A portable toilet in a British Royal Air Force WWII plane

The close stool, built as an article of furniture, is one of the earliest forms of portable toilet. They can still be seen in historic house museums such as Sir George-Étienne Cartier National Historic Site in Old Montreal, Canada. The velvet upholstered close stool used by William III is on display at Hampton Court Palace; see Groom of the Stool.

Early versions of the "Elsan chemical closet" ("closet" meaning a small room, see water closet, WC, and earth closet) were sold at Army & Navy Stores. Their use in World War II bomber aircraft is described at some length by the Bomber Command Museum of Canada; in brief, they were not popular with either the flying crew or the ground crew.

African-Americans living under Jim Crow laws (i.e. before the Civil Rights Act of 1964) faced severe challenges. Public toilets were segregated by race, and many restaurants and gas stations refused to serve black people, so some travellers carried a portable toilet in the trunk of their car.

Since 1974, Grand Canyon guides rafting on the Colorado River have used ammunition boxes as portable toilets, typically with a removable toilet seat, according to the Museum of Northern Arizona in Flagstaff, Arizona.

== Society and culture ==
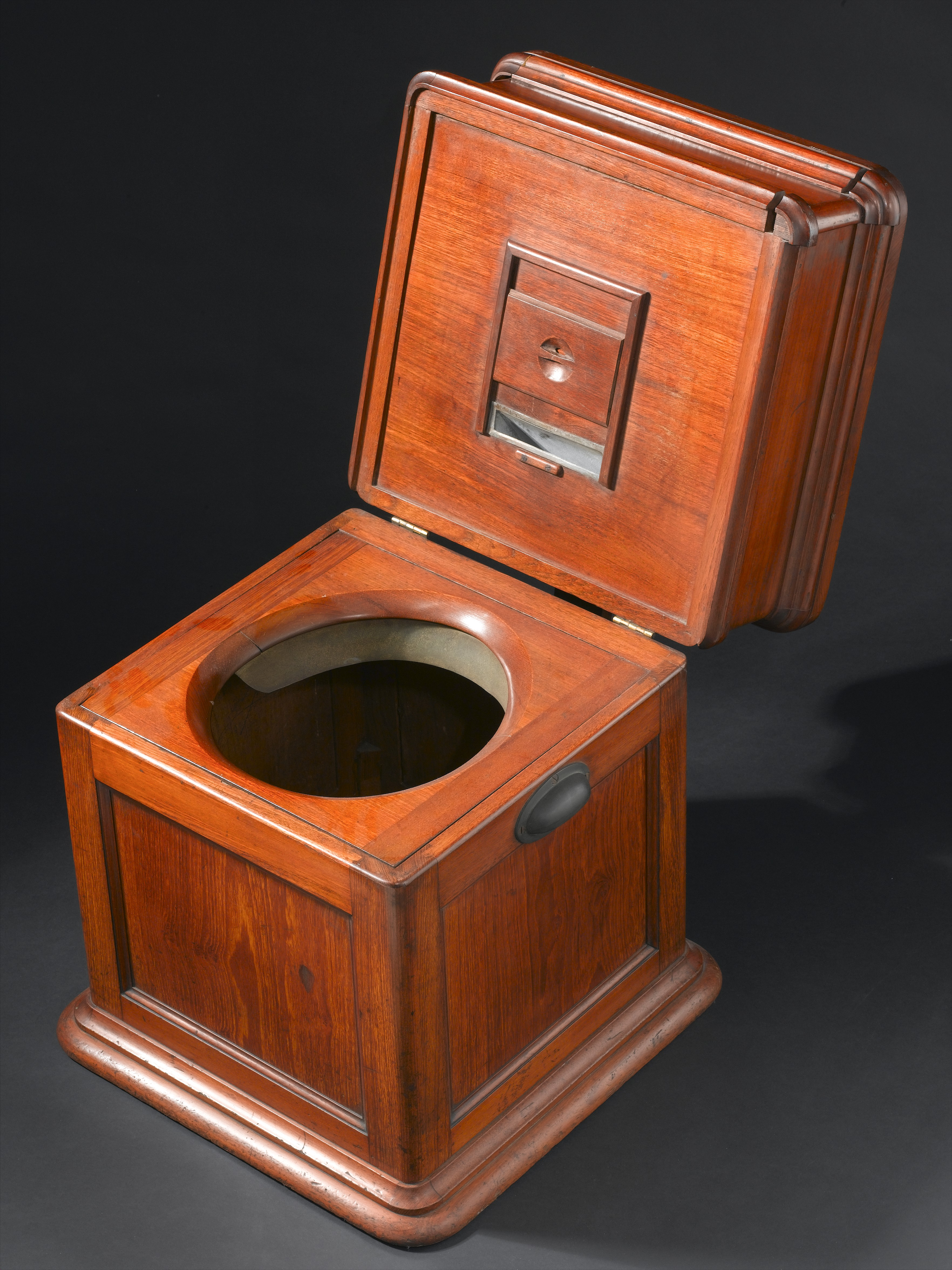
19th century "thunderbox" portable toilet

A slang term, now dated or historic, is a "thunder-box" (Oxford English Dictionary: "a portable commode; by extension, any lavatory"). The term was used particularly in British India; travel writer Stephen McClarence called it "a crude sort of colonial lavatory". One features to comic effect in Evelyn Waugh's novel Men at Arms:

"If you must know, it's my thunderbox." ... He...dragged out the treasure, a brass-bound, oak cube... On the inside of the lid was a plaque bearing the embossed title Connolly's Chemical Closet.

Another slang term "The Johnny on the Spot" refers to portable restrooms always being conveniently available, denoting a similar meaning as the original phrase.

== See also ==
- Accessible toilet
- Dignified Mobile Toilets, a mobile public toilet system from Nigeria
- Sanitation
- Telescopic toilet
- Jim Crow laws
