= Dry dung fuel =

Animal feces that has been dried in order to be used as a fuel source

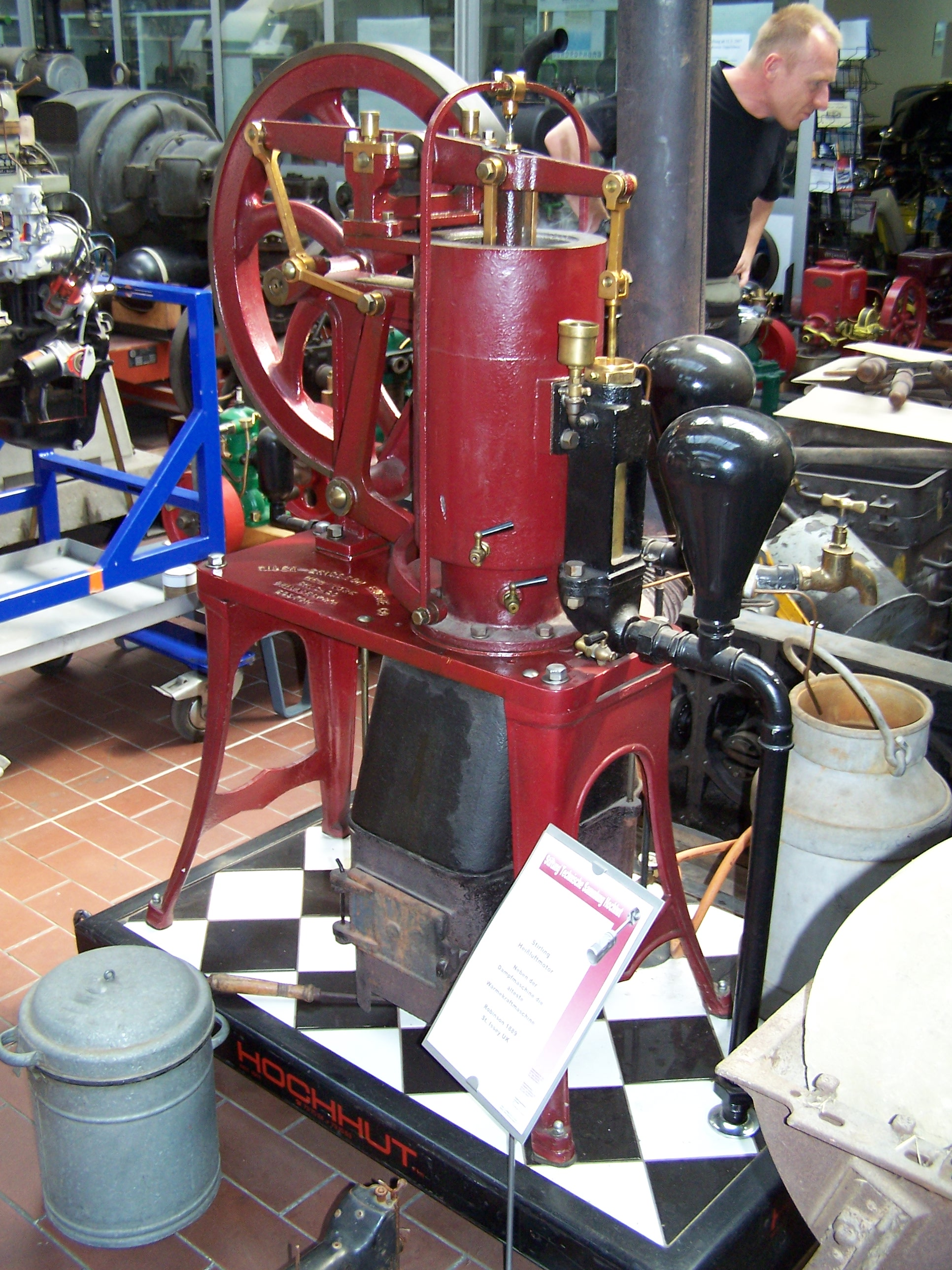
Stirling-Motor powered with cow dung in the Technical Collection Hochhut in Frankfurt am Main

Dry dung fuel (or dry manure fuel) is feces, generally of domestic animals, that have been dried in order to be burned as a fuel source. It is used in many countries, and in some instances employs human feces. Despite the disadvantage of increasing air pollution, the practice remains a common use of this kind of manure.

== Types ==
=== Dry dung and moist dung ===
Dry dung is more commonly used than moist dung, because it burns more easily. Dry manure is typically defined as having a moisture content less than 30 percent.

=== Dung cakes ===
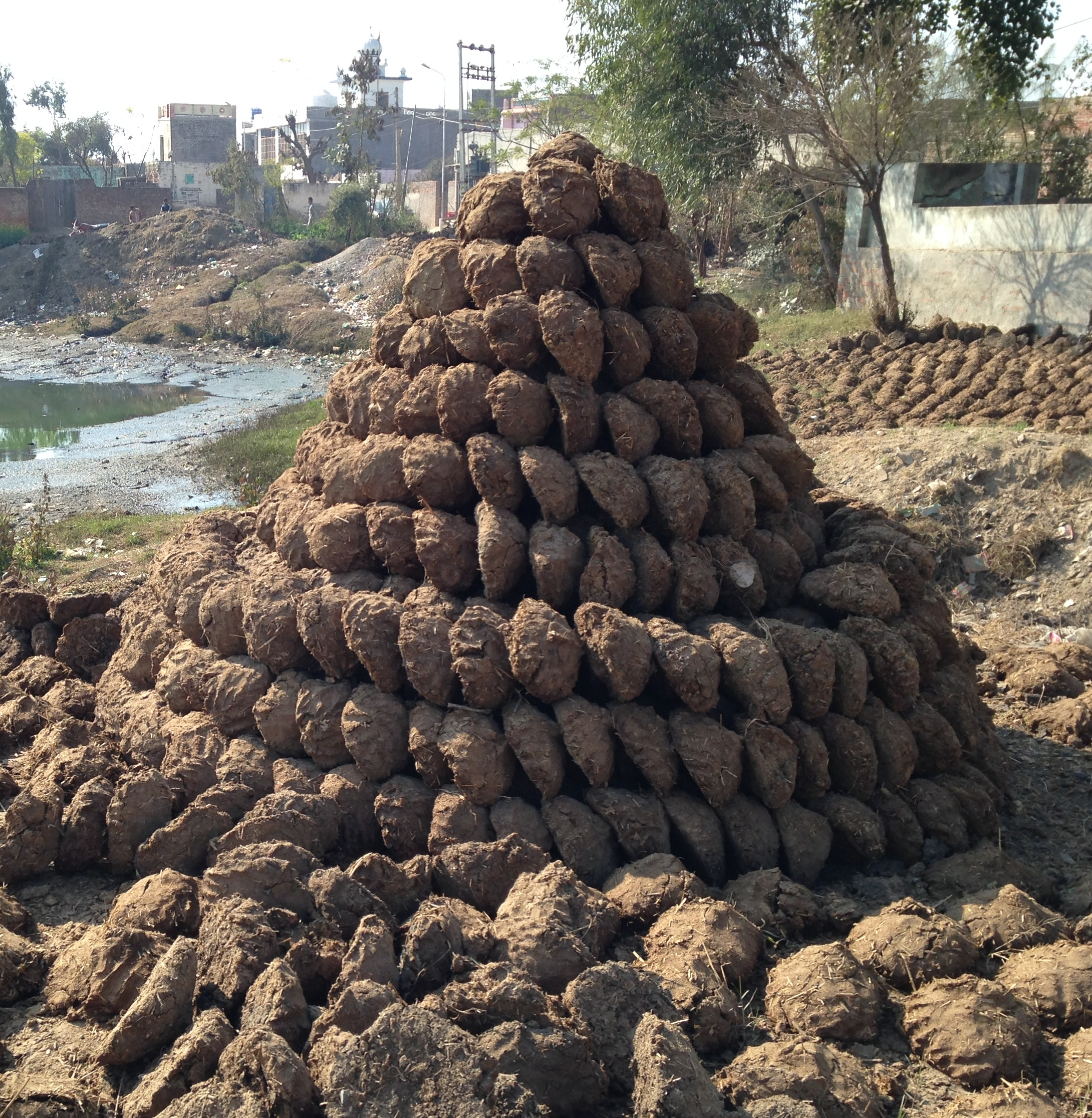
A pile of dung cakes in the village Nihal Singh Wala of Moga district in Punjab

"Dung cakes", made from the by-products of animal husbandry, are traditionally used as fuel in India for cooking food in a domestic hearth called a Chulha. They are made by hand by village women, traditionally of cow or buffalo dung. One dung cake size of a hand gives around 2100 kJ of energy. Dung cakes are also known as goitha, uple, kande, gosse or thepdi.

These cakes are molded with a curvature to keep them stuck to the walls. Once dried, they are piled and covered with thatch called bitauda. These bitaudas can be seen in parts of rural India, albeit with different names. The size and shape of the cake may vary with region. It is also not uncommon to see the cakes directly used in earthen ovens.

This biofuel has been used primarily for two reasons: for easy disposal of cow dung and as an easily available and cheap fuel.

=== Human feces ===
Human feces can in principle also be dried and used as a fuel source if they are collected in a type of dry toilet, for example an incinerating toilet. Since 2011, the Bill & Melinda Gates Foundation is supporting the development of such toilets as part of their "Reinvent the Toilet Challenge" to promote safer, more effective ways to treat human excreta. The omni-processor is another example of using human feces contained in fecal sludge or sewage sludge as a fuel source.

== Attributes ==
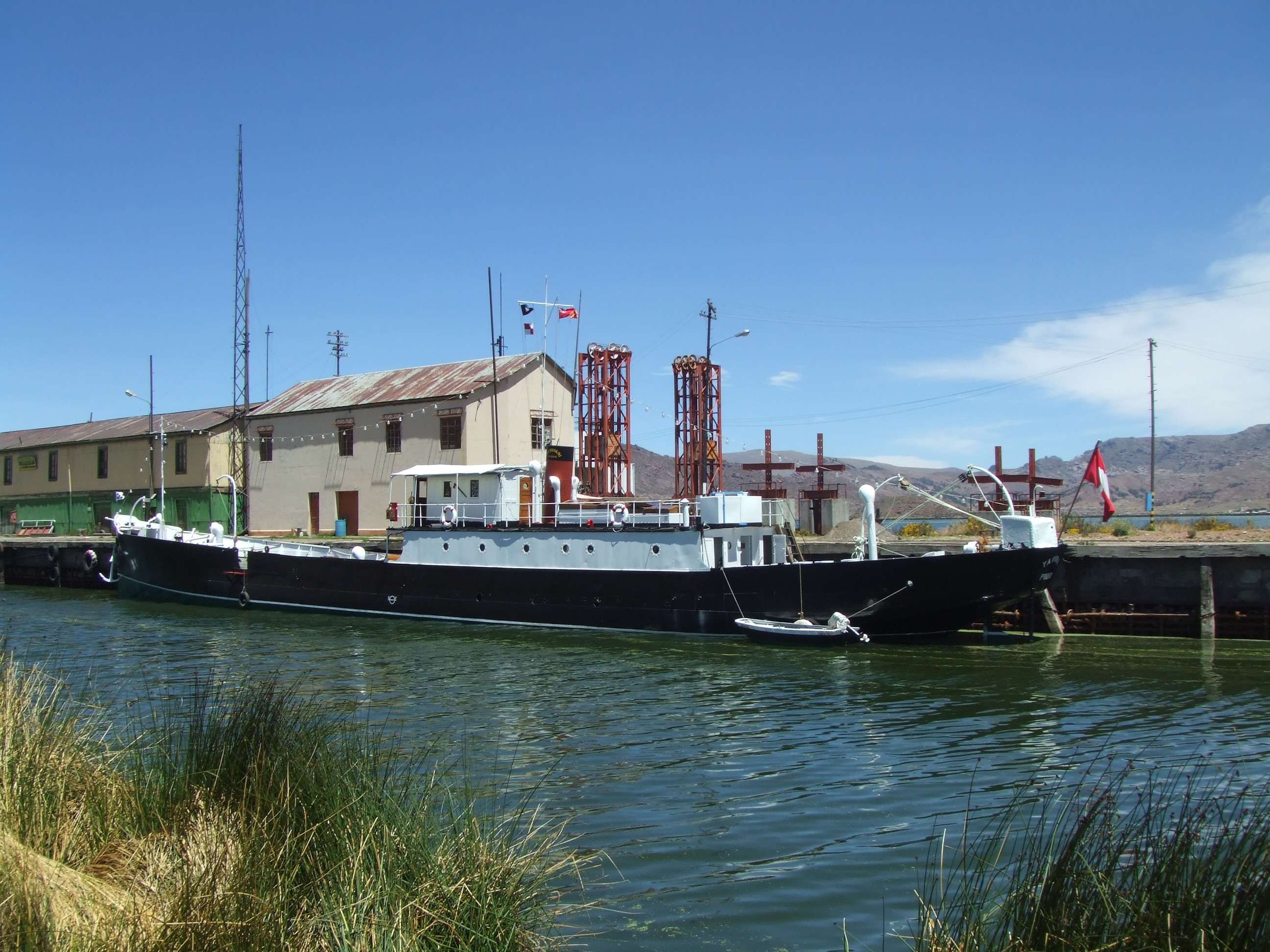
The M.N. Yavari, of Peru built by Thames Iron Works, London in 1861-62 had a Watt steam engine powered by dried llama dung until 1914

Advantages of using dry animal dung include:

- Potential for cost savings compared to other fuels, as no cash outlay is necessary for purchase
- Availability
- Ease of collection
- Alleviation of local pressure on wood resources

== Countries ==
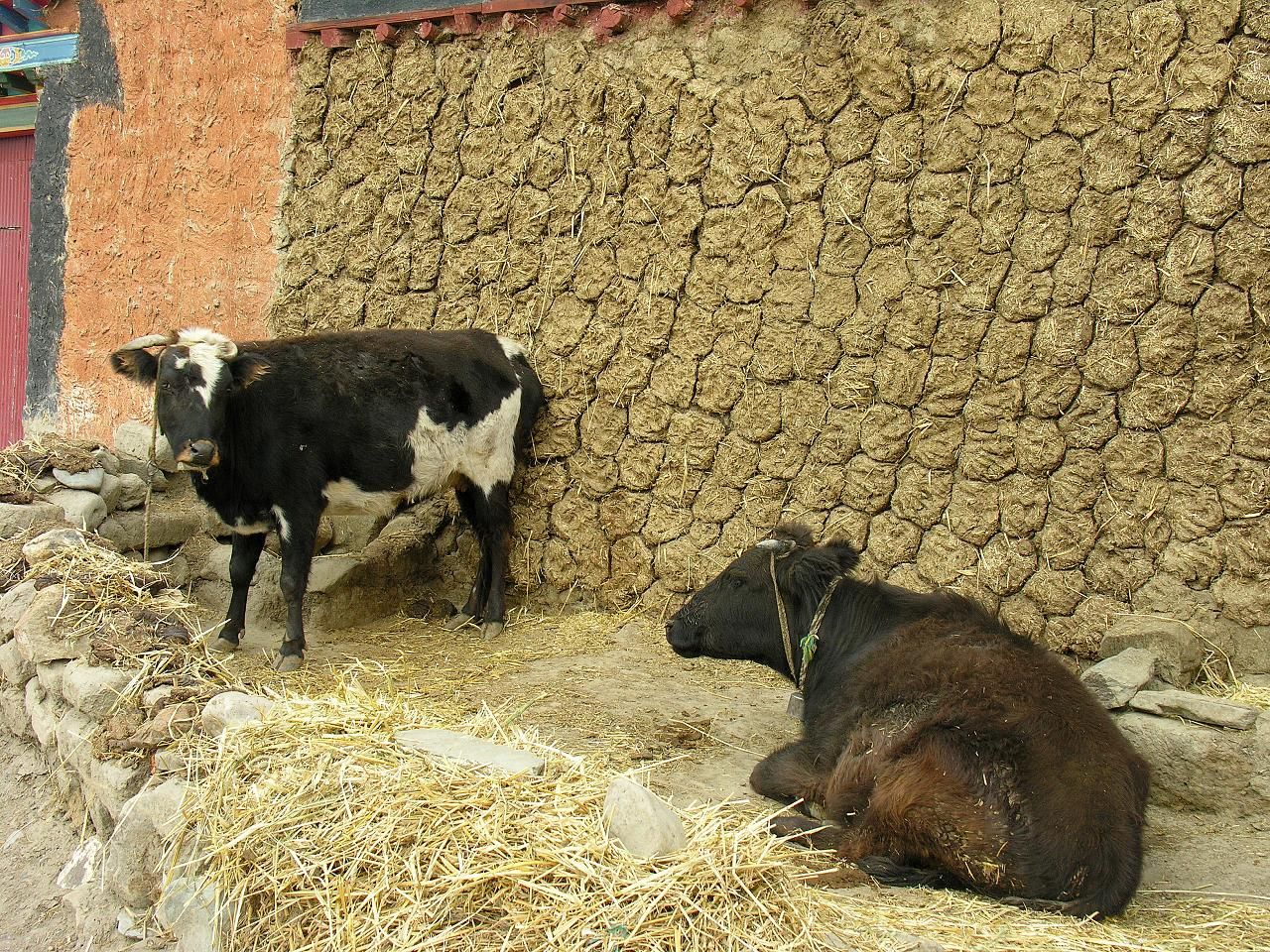
Drying cow dung fuel

=== Africa ===
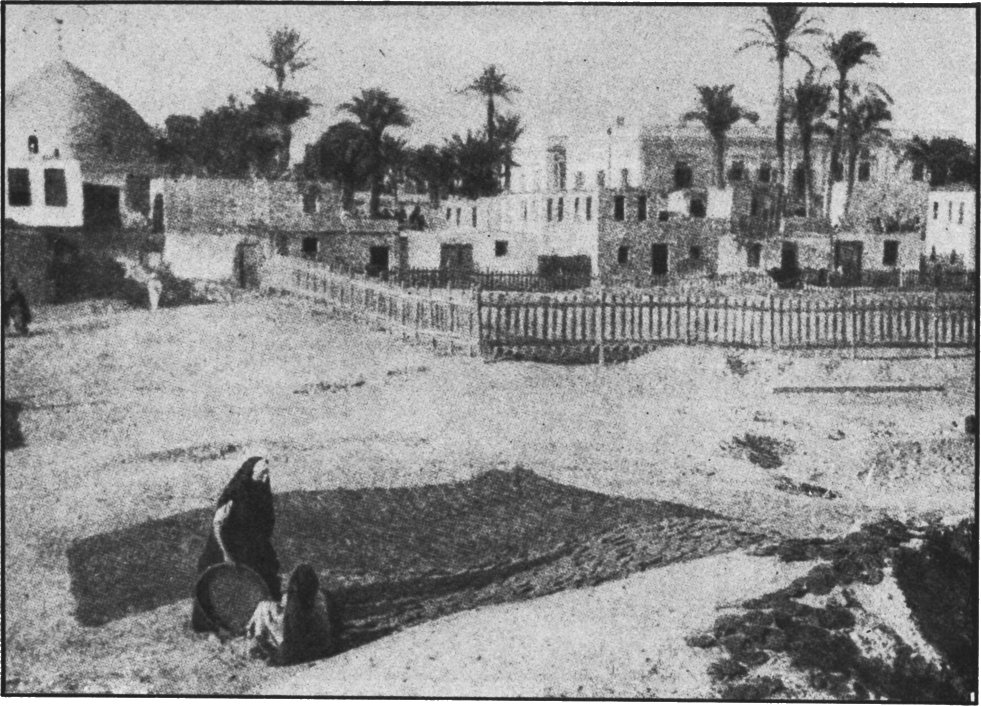
Egyptian women making "Gella" dry animal dung fuel

- In Egypt dry animal dung (from cows & buffaloes) is mixed with straw or crop residues to make dry fuel called "Gella" or "Jilla" dung cakes in modern times and ""khoroshtof"" in medieval times. Ancient Egyptians used the dry animal dung as a source of fuel. Dung cakes and building crop residues were the source of 76.4% of gross energy consumed in Egypt's rural areas during the 1980s. Temperatures of dung-fueled fires in an experiment on Egyptian village-made dung cake fuel were:

"...a maximum of 640 °C in 12 minutes, falling to 240 °C after 25 minutes and 100 °C after 46 minutes. These temperatures were obtained without refueling and without bellows etc."

Also, camel dung is used as fuel in Egypt.

- Lisu is the cakes of dry cow dung fuel in Lesotho (see photo)

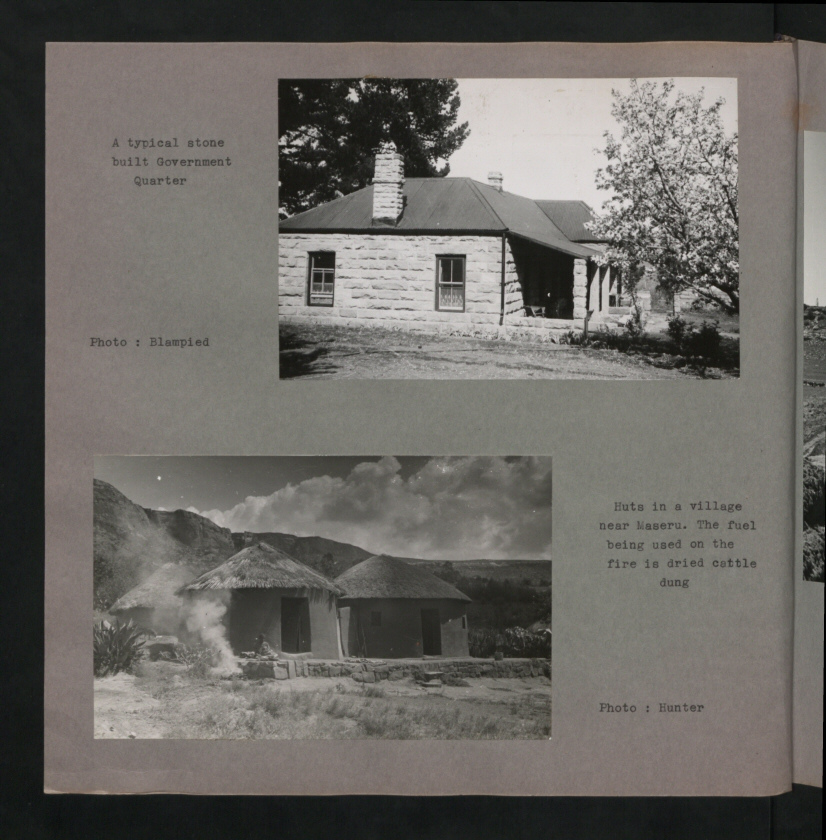
Huts in a village near Maseru, Lesotho. The fuel being used on the fire is dried cattle dung

- Mali

=== Asia ===
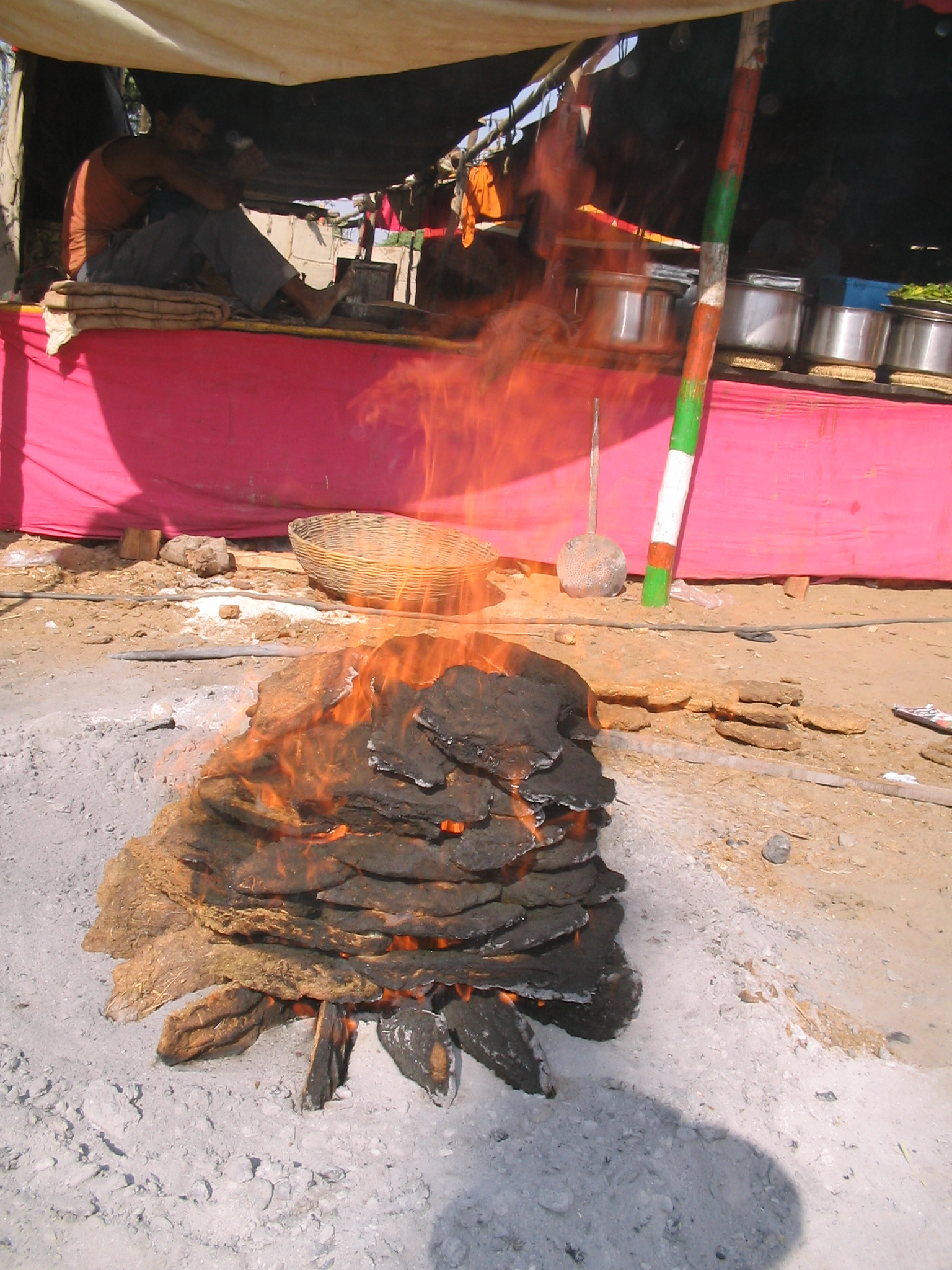
Dung cooking fire. Pushkar India.

- Afghanistan, Tapi (تپی ) and used in villages and countrysides
- Azerbaijan, Кизяк (kizyak) is used as fuel in mountain villages, e.g. *Xinaliq
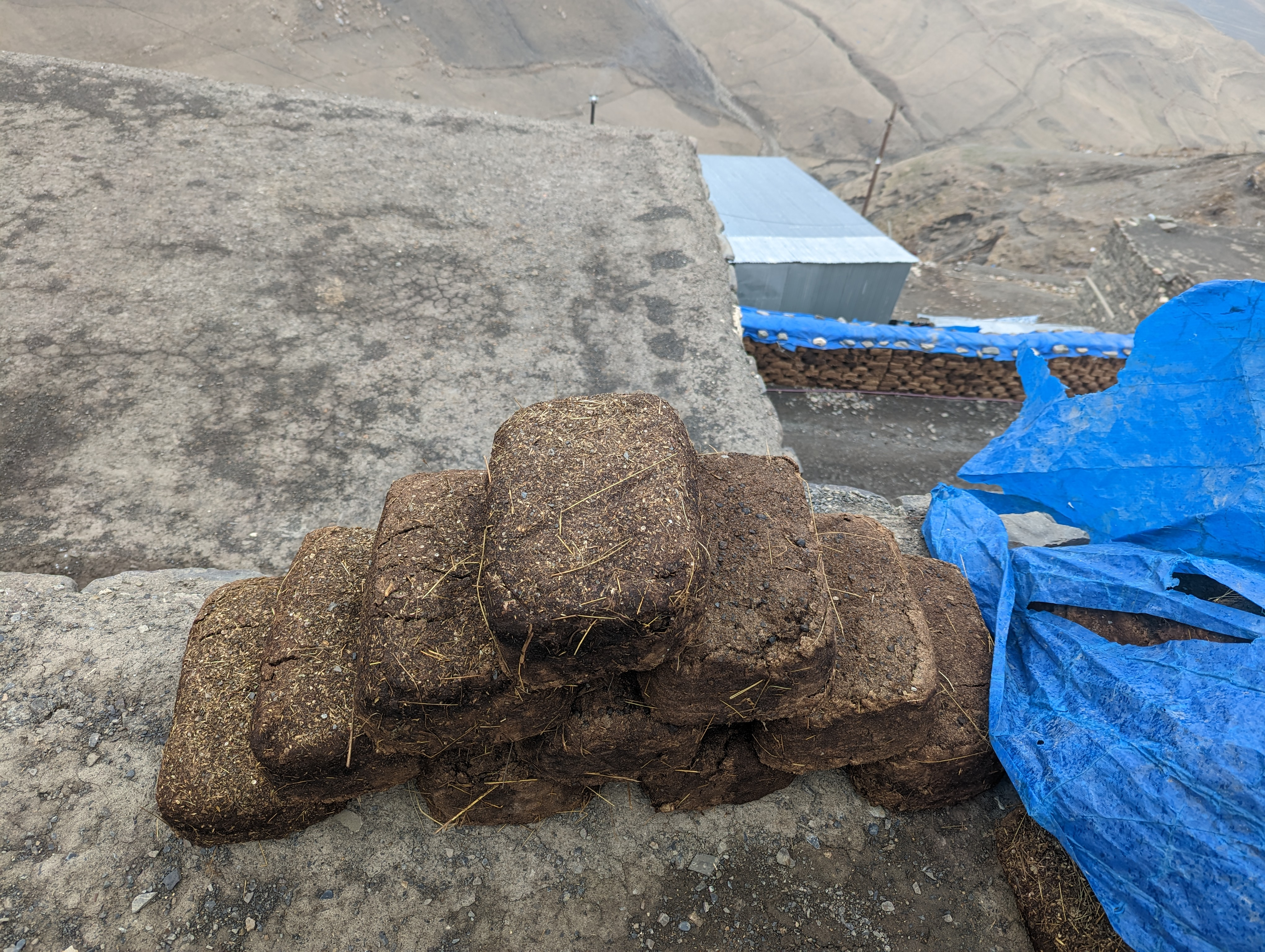
  кизяк (kizyak)
- Bangladesh, dry cow dung fuel is called Ghunte.
- China
- India, dry buffalo dung is used as fuel and it is sometimes a sacred practice to use cow dung fuel in some areas in India. Cow dung is known as "Gomaya" or "Komaya" in India. Dry animal dung cakes are called upla in Hindi.
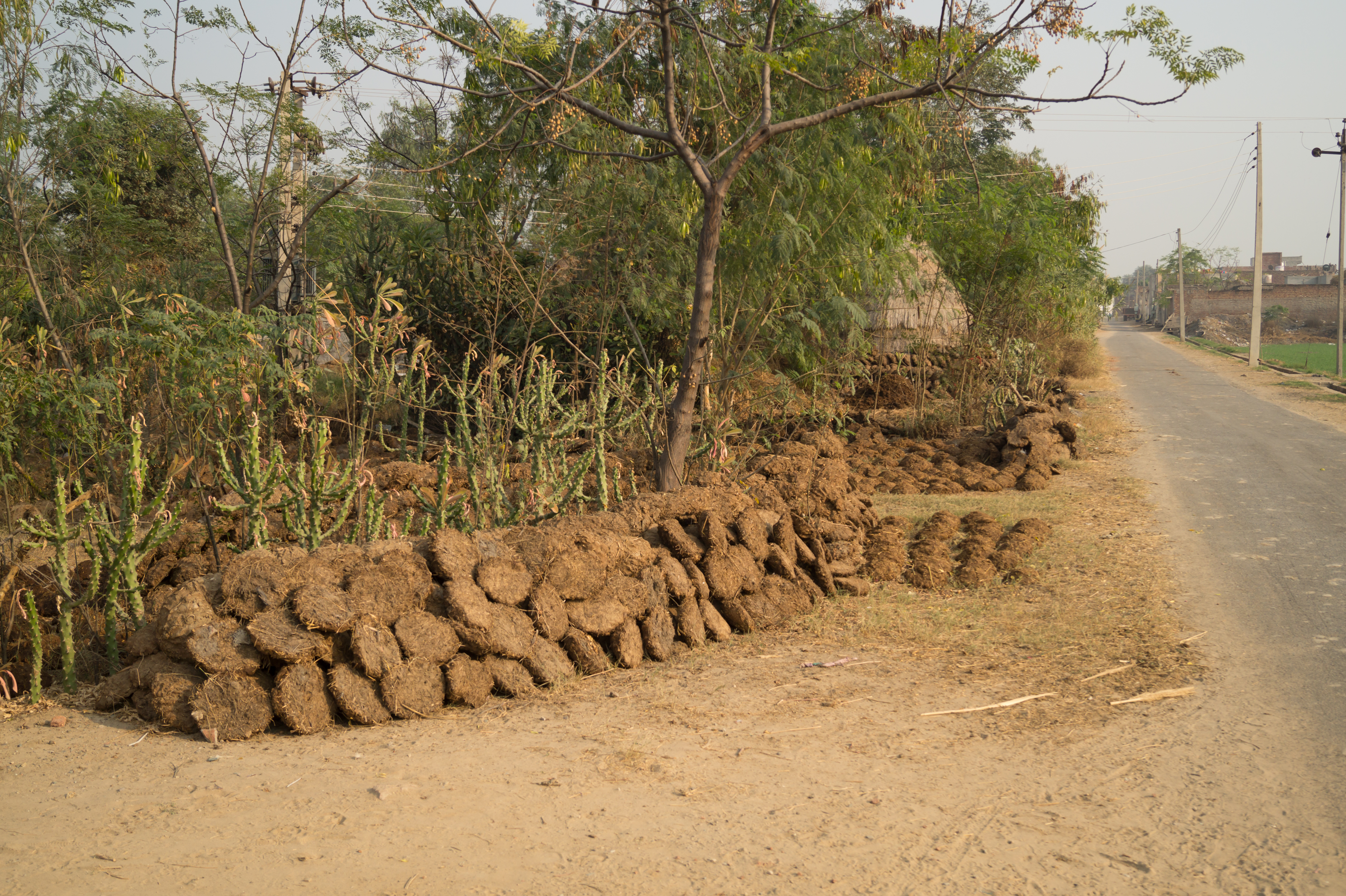
  Dungcakes at Village Bhraj, Sangrur District, Punjab
- Iran, Tapaleh (تاپاله )since prehistoric time to modern eras
- Iraq, this kind of biofuel is named locally Muttal, and it is made in the shape of a disc made from cow or buffalo dung, with a diameter of 20–30 cm and a thickness of 2–5 cm. It is famous in its manufacture by the indigenous people of the marshes of Iraq in particular, and the residents of southern and Middle Euphrates of Iraq in general. It is used in the bakery of rice bread, and in grilling fish to form the favorite food of the people of the marshes, which is Tabag bread and grilled fish, and also is used to burn and emit smoke for a day or more to protect humans, animals and plants from harmful insects. It is stored in the form of heaps, called Gubbah, and is usually mixed with hay in storage, and used in times when there is little fuel.
- Kazakhs dry animal dung is known as "Кизяк" (romanized: kizyak) which is made by collecting dried animal dung on the steppe, wetting it in water then mixing it with straw then making it in discs which were then dried in the sun. It was used as a source of fuel for the winter and, throughout the summer.
- Kyrgyz Republic, dung is used in specially designed home stoves, which vent to the outside
- Mongolia, dry cow dung and sheep dung cakes are commonly used as fuel.
- Nepal

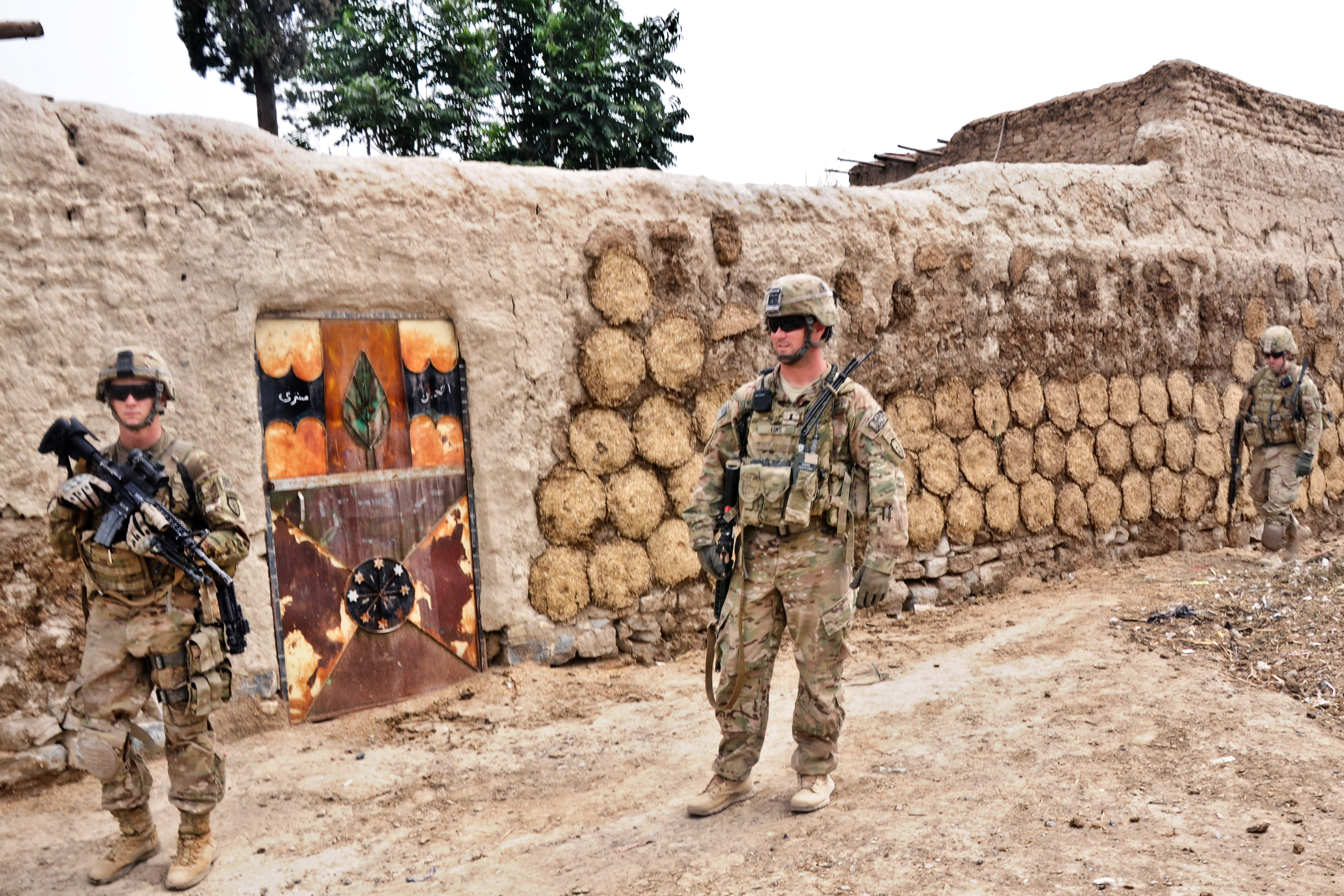
U.S. soldiers patrolling outside a qalat covered in caked and dried cow dung in an Afghan village

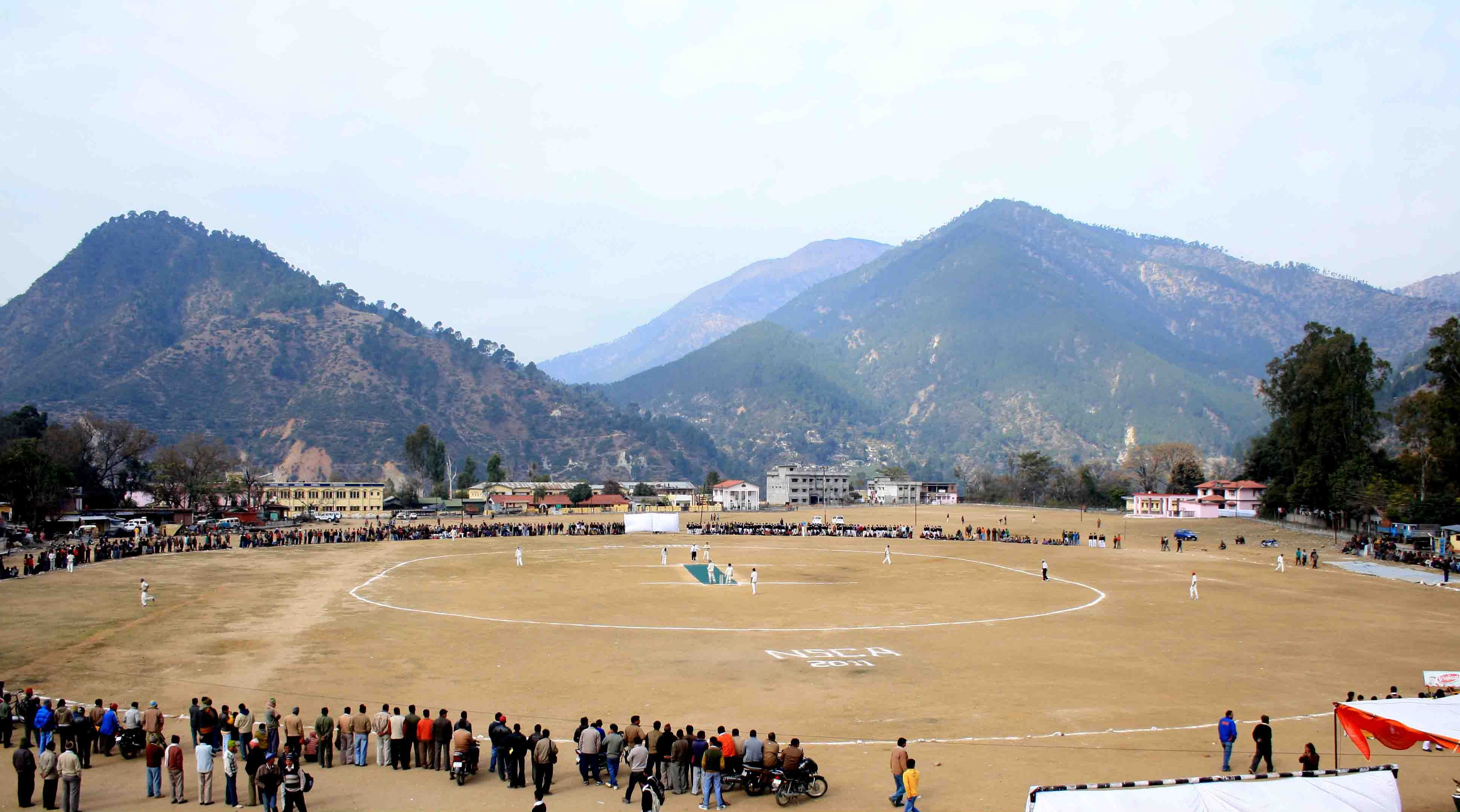
Cow dung fuel was burnt on the Gauchar's Historical Field, India to gauge the direction of air currents

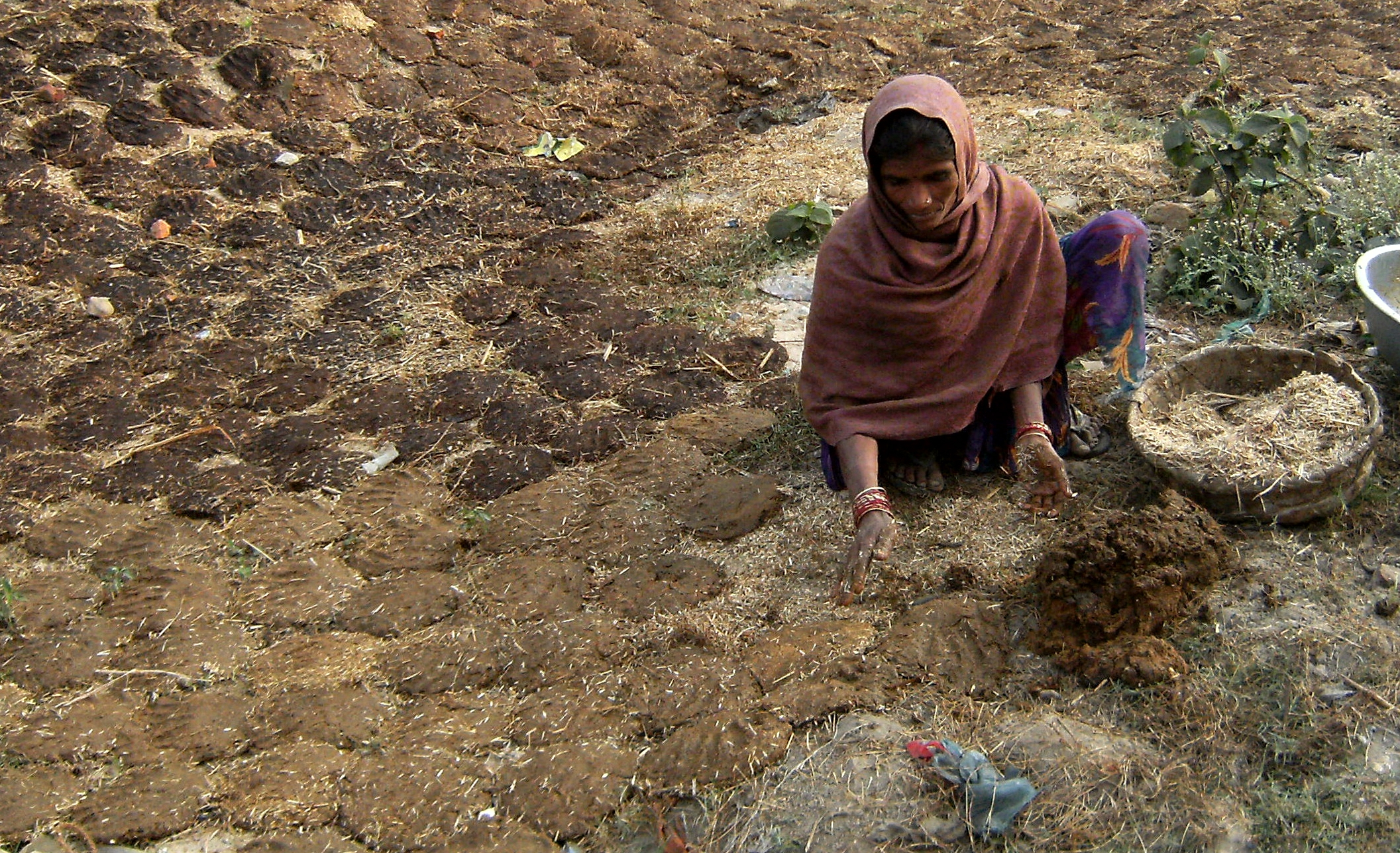
Making Komaya (cow dung fuel) in India

=== Europe ===
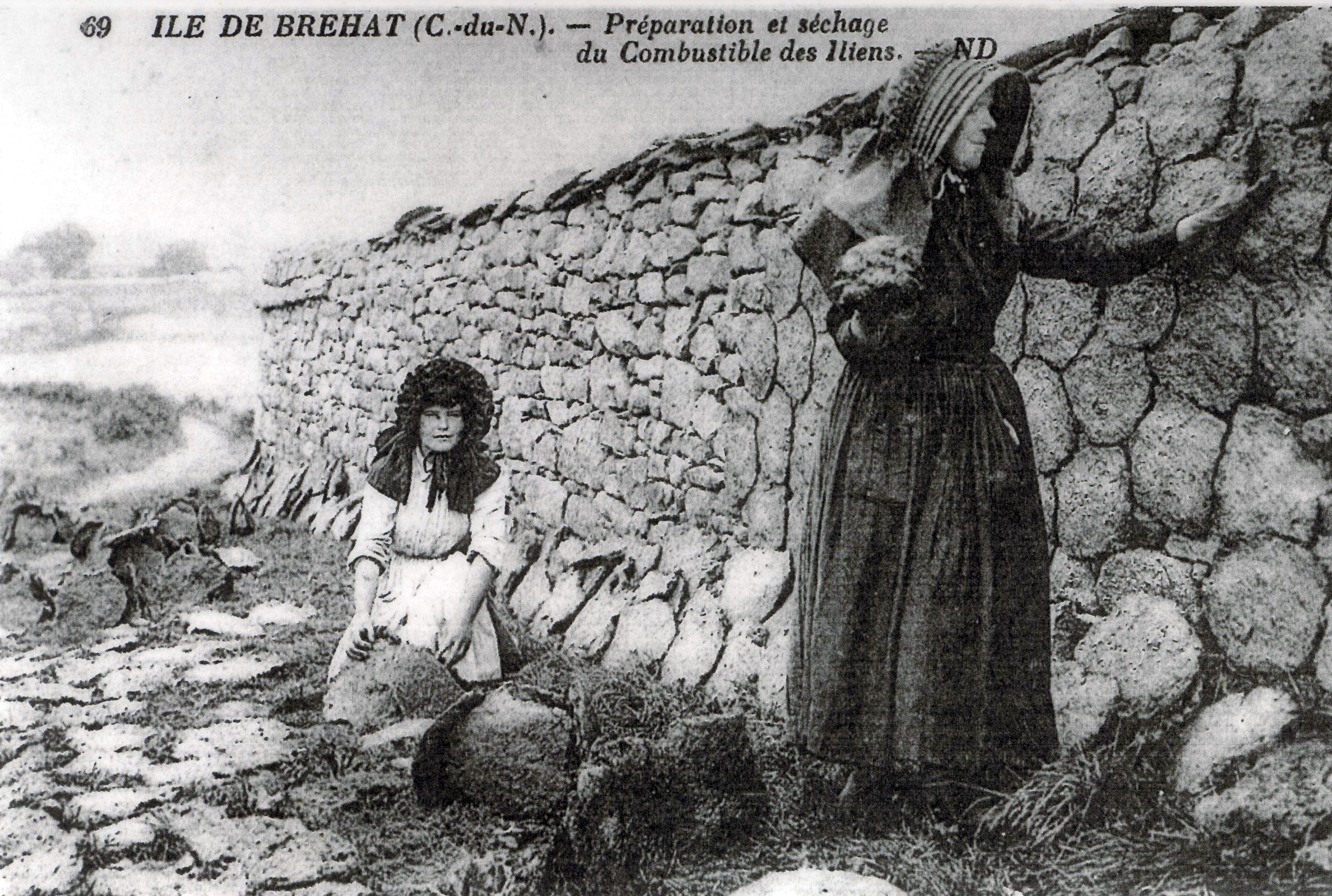
Dung cakes being prepared for fuel on the Ile de Brehat, Brittany, France, c. 1900

- France: in Maison du Marais in Coulon (Poitou-Charentes) there is a demonstration of traditional usage of dry dung fuel.

=== The Americas ===
- Early European settlers on the Great Plains of the United States used dried buffalo manure as a fuel, calling it "buffalo chips", due to the scarcity of trees and wood on the plains.
- Pueblo Indians used dry animal dung as a fuel
- In Peru, the Yavari steam ship was fueled by llama dung fuel for several decades.
- Dry dung can be used in the production of celluloid for film.

== History ==
Dry animal dung was used from prehistoric times, including in Ancient Persia, Ancient Egypt and early modern England. In Equatorial Guinea archaeological evidence has been found of the practice, and biblical records indicate animal and human dung were used as fuel.

== Air pollution ==
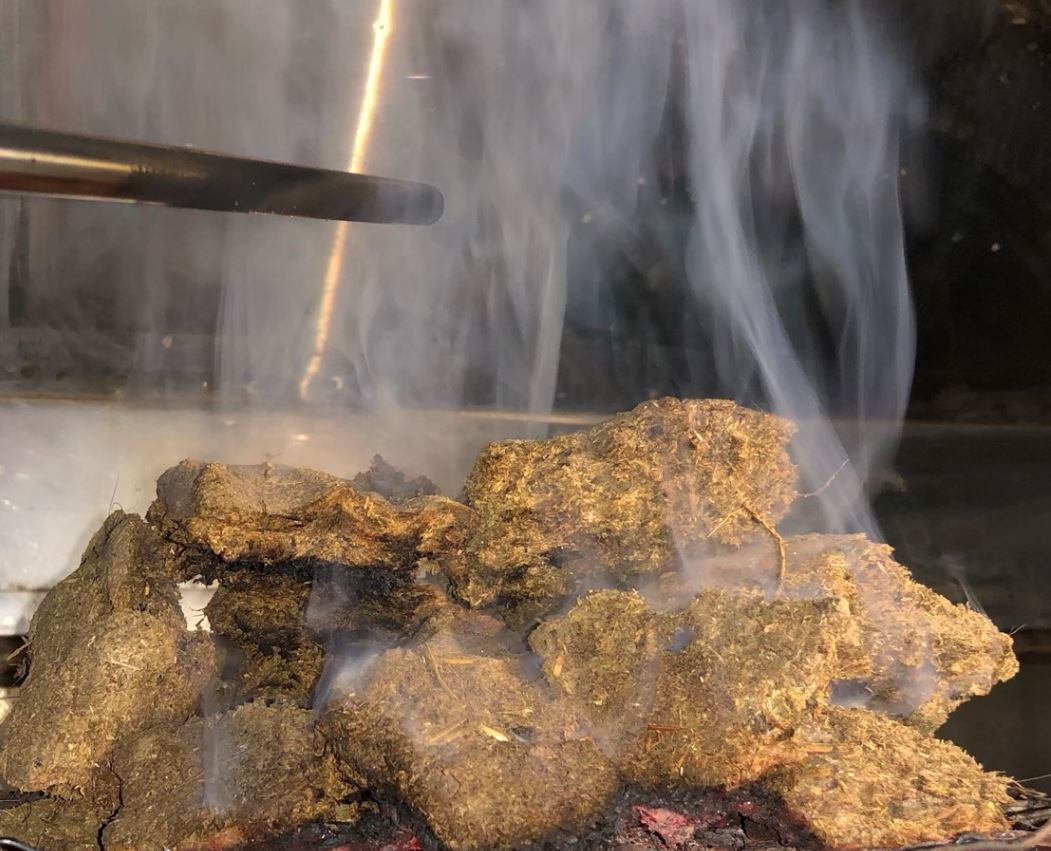
The burning of cow dung cake releases a range of organic and inorganic gases in both gas and particle phases

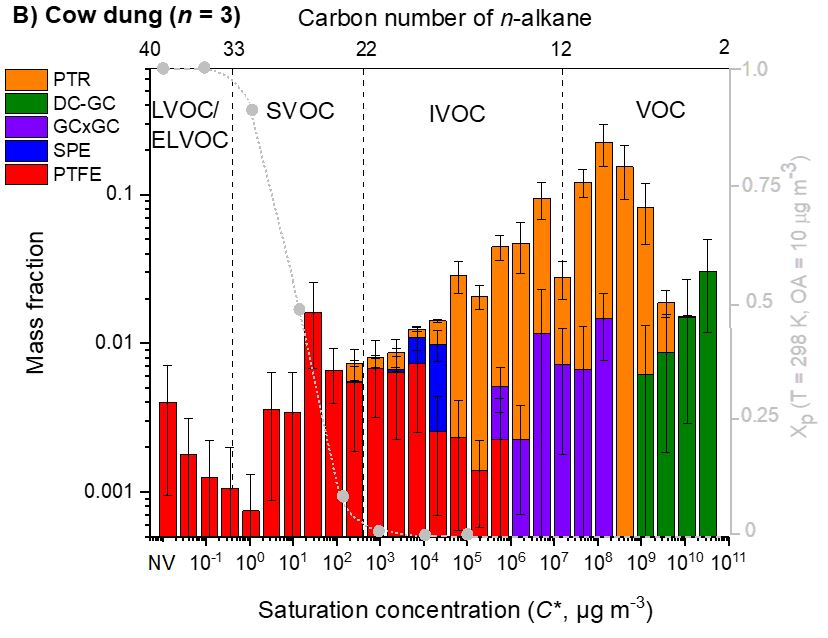
The burning of cow dung cake releases organic air pollutants over a wide range of volatilities into both gas and particle phases.

The combustion of dried dung cakes has been shown to release many thousands of organic components into gas and aerosol phases, some of which are unique tracers of dung combustion, such as cholestanol and coprostanol. Dung cakes are generally a higher emission fuel, with the combustion of cow dung cake samples collected from the Delhi area of India releasing around four times more volatile organic compounds than fuel wood samples.

The volatile organic compounds released from cow dung cake combustion have been shown to be significantly more reactive with the hydroxyl radical, with the gases released from the combustion of cow dung cake samples collected from Delhi in India around 120 times more reactive with the hydroxyl radical than the emissions from liquefied petroleum gas. The volatile organic compounds from cow dung cake combustion have also been shown to result in 3-4 times more secondary organic aerosol production than fuel wood and release many more toxic polycyclic aromatic hydrocarbons.

== See also ==
- Cook stove
