= Dignified Mobile Toilets =

Mobile public toilet system based in Nigeria

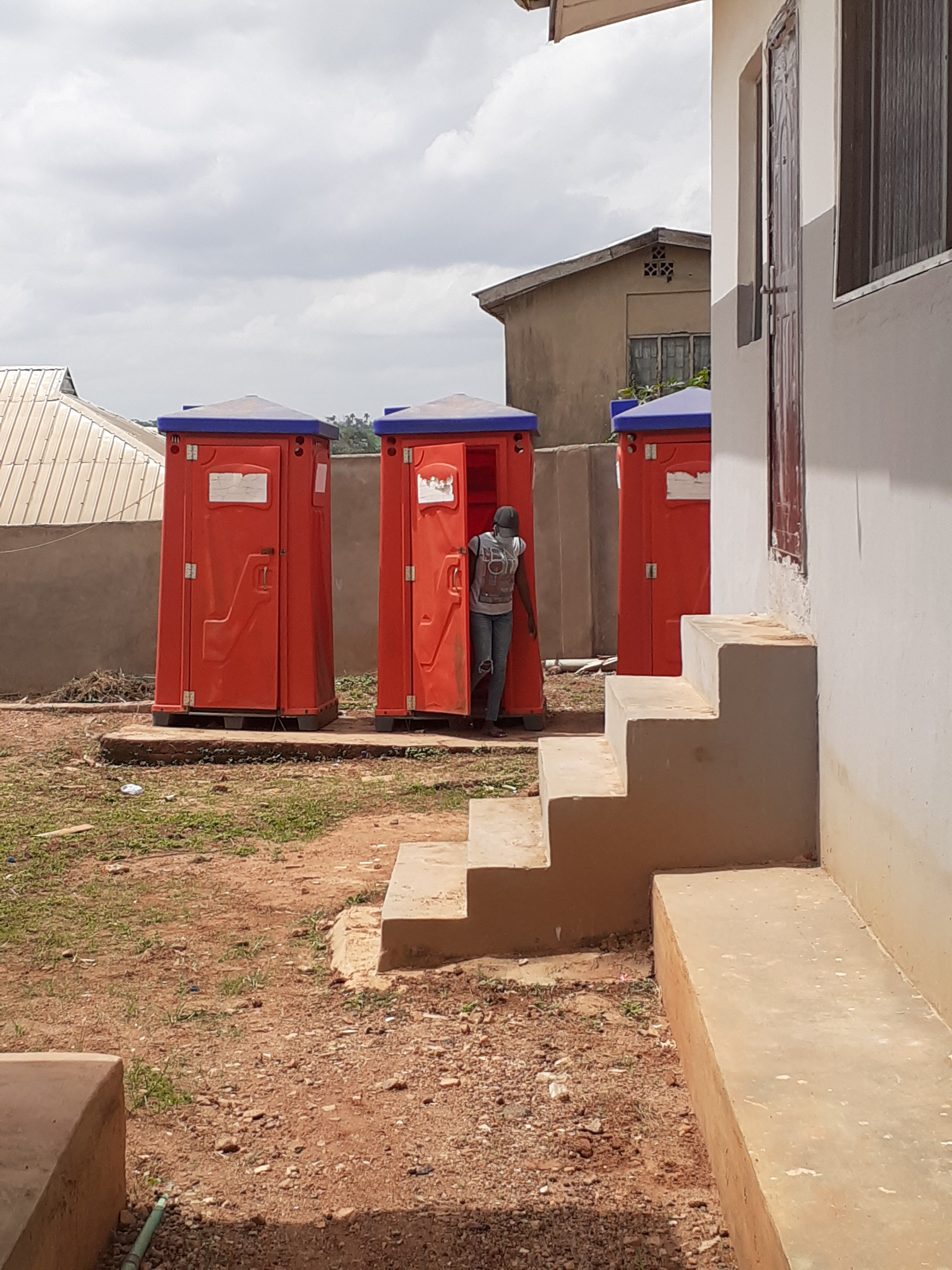
Mobile Toilet

Dignified Mobile Toilets (DMT) is a mobile public toilet system created in 1992 by Isaac Durojaiye. Known by the slogan "shit business is serious business!"; it was the first in Nigeria, initially conceived as a solution to providing human comfort during outdoor parties, events and other social gatherings. The mobile toilets are manufactured in Nigeria, and rented or sold in Nigeria and other West African countries. After its inception, DMT aimed at reducing the public toilets deficit and improving sanitation particularly among residents in the city of Lagos.
