= Arborloo =

Composting toilet

Steps of usage of the arborloo.

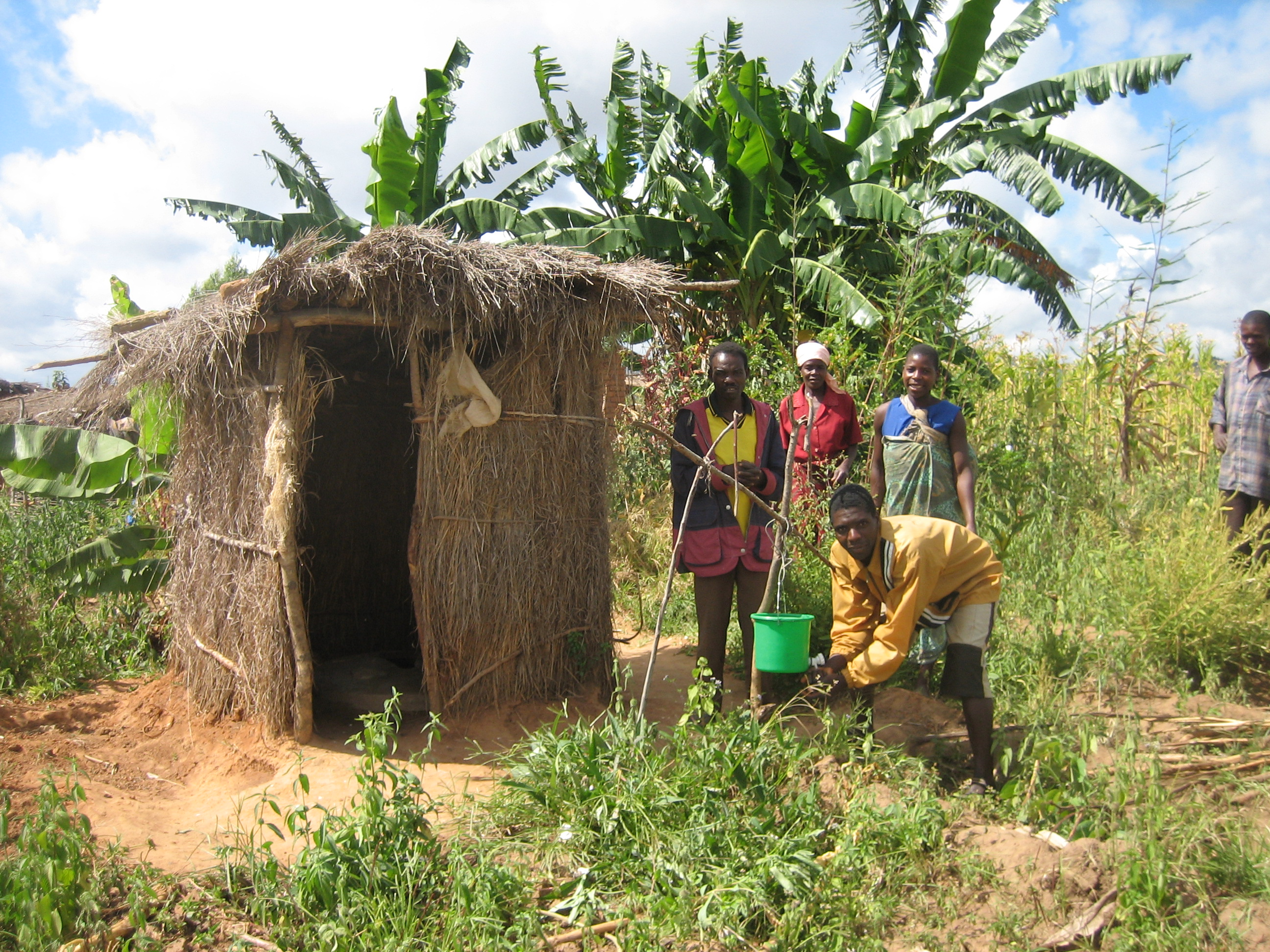
Arborloo in Ekwendeni, Malawi

An arborloo is a simple type of composting toilet in which feces are collected in a shallow pit and a fruit tree is later planted in the fertile soil of the full pit. Arborloos have: a pit like a pit latrine but less deep; a concrete, ferrocement or other strong floor; a superstructure (toilet house or outhouse) to provide privacy; and possibly a ring beam to protect the pit from collapsing. The pit should remain well above the water table in the soil, so as to not contaminate groundwater.

The arborloo works by temporarily putting the slab and superstructure above a shallow pit while it fills. Feces, urine, paper, leaves, other materials for wiping, and potentially anal wash water all go into the pit. After each use, a cup of the excavated soil should be added to help to control smell and flies. When the pit is nearly full, the outhouse and slab are moved to a newly dug pit and the old pit is covered with some of the earth from the new pit and left to compost. A fruit tree or other useful vegetation is planted in the old pit, preferably during the rainy season.

Feces are safely stored and converted in the soil, avoiding disease transmission, and do not have to be processed or manipulated by anyone. Instead, fruits on trees are grown, fertilised by human excreta.

The arborloo is a type of dry toilet. By using the nutrient-rich soil of a retired pit, the arborloo, in effect, treats feces as a resource rather than a waste product. Arborloos are used in rural areas of many developing countries, for example in Zimbabwe, Malawi and Ethiopia.

== Design ==
The defecation pit may be circular or square and this may depend on the slab and superstructure. A circular pit is less likely to collapse. The pit of the arborloo is shallow (between 1 and 1.5 meters (3 ft 3 in and 4 ft 11 in) deep).

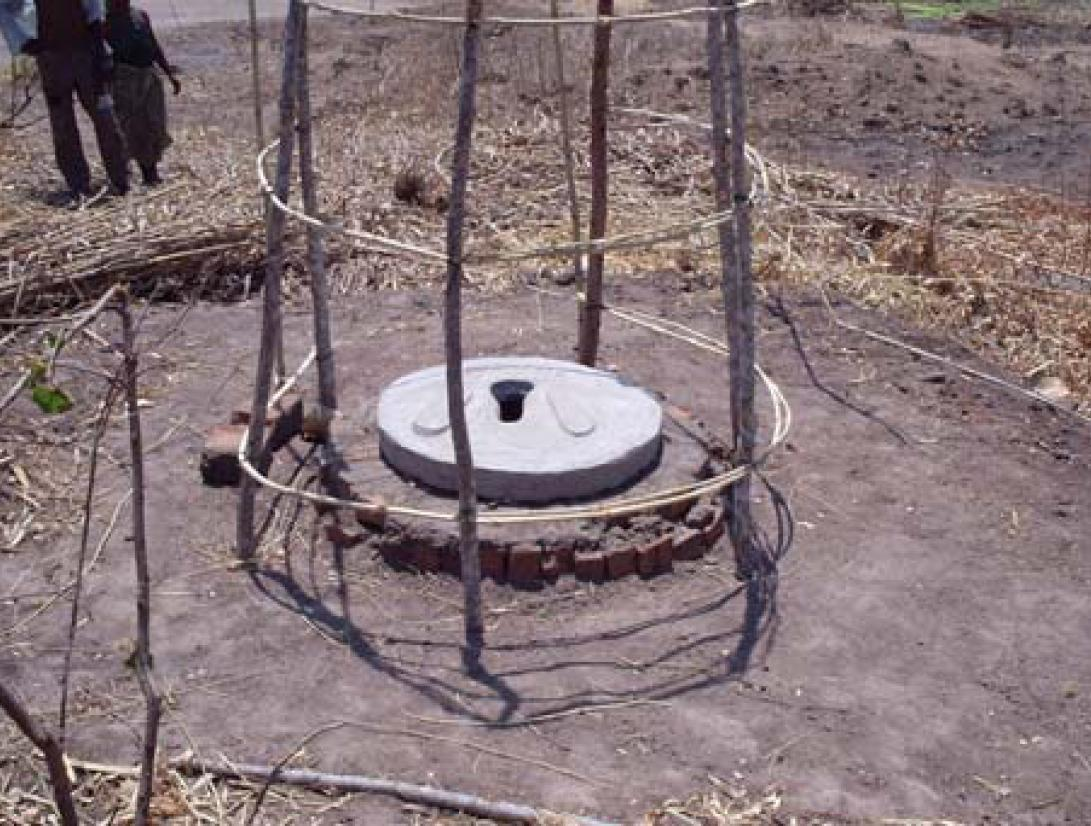
A squat slab covering the drop hole of an Arborloo in Malawi. The slab can be rolled from one location to the next.

If the pit is dug by hand it must have a diameter of at least 0.9 meters (2 ft 11 in) to accommodate effective digging. The floor should be at least 20 centimeters (7.9 in) wider than the pit, to allow for its stability. If the floor is round and unattached to the outhouse, it can be rolled to the new pit.

A roof is optional, especially if the floor is made such that rain runoff does not flow into the pit. The advantages of not making a roof include: more light, better ventilation, automatic rinsing with the rain, disinfection via solar ultraviolet radiation, reduced cost, and less weight.

== See also ==
- Ecological sanitation
- Reuse of excreta
- Treebog, another version
- Urine-diverting dry toilet
- Waterless urinal

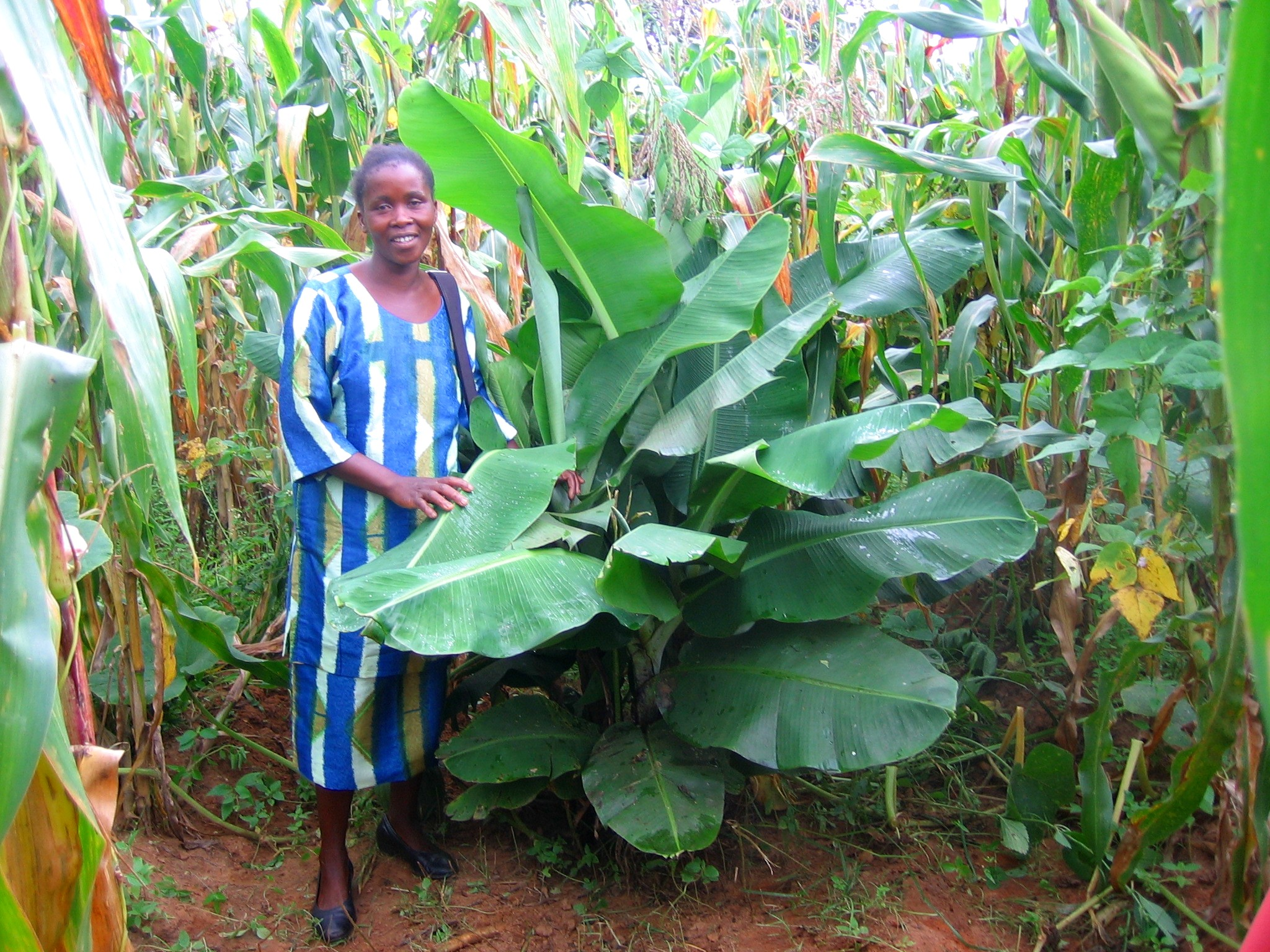
A banana plant growing vigorously on an ArborLoo pit.
