= Incinerating toilet =

Type of dry toilet that burns human feces

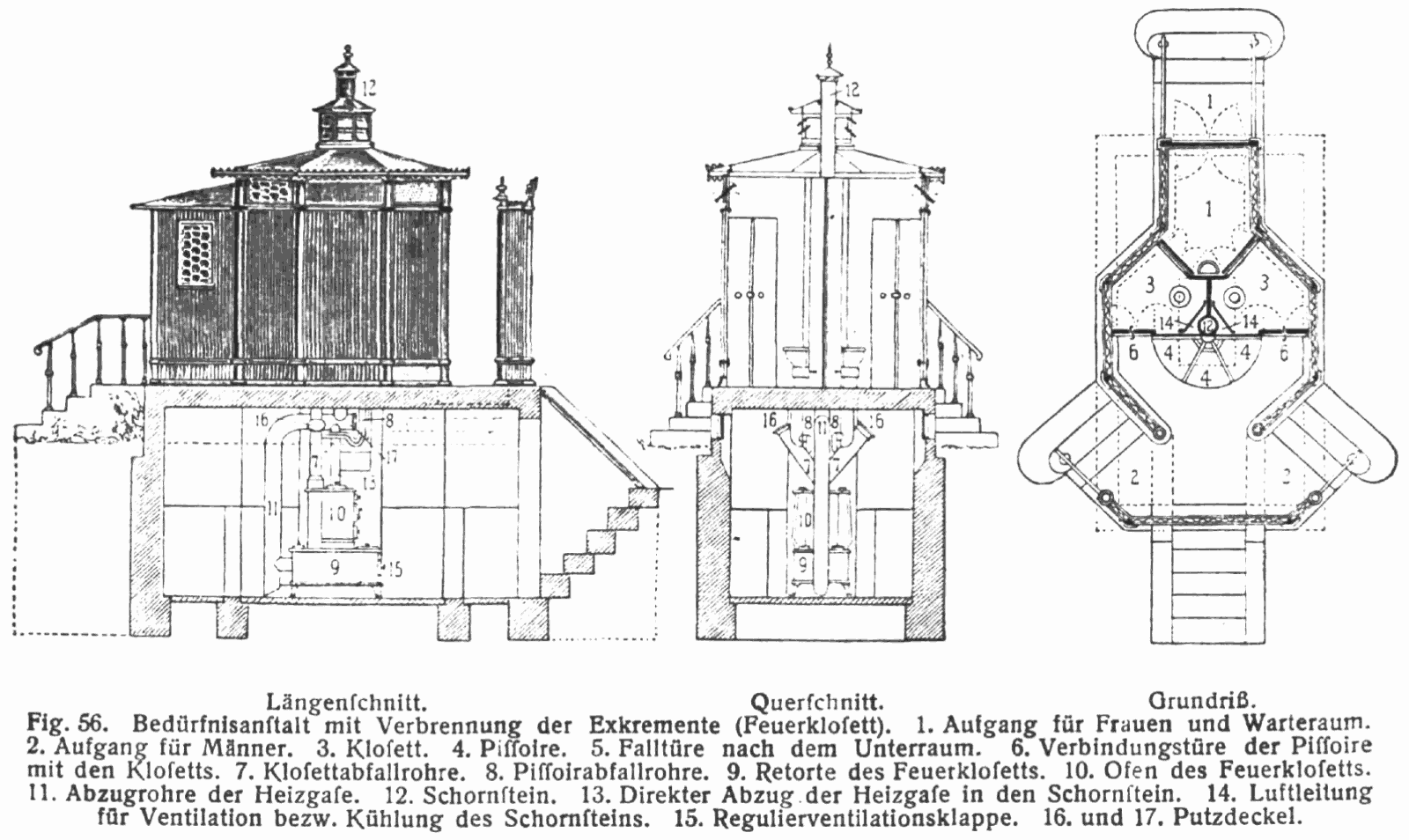
An example of an early (1904) incinerating toilet from the Lexikon der gesamten Technik

An incinerating toilet is a type of dry toilet that burns human feces instead of flushing them away with water, as does a flush toilet. The thermal energy used to incinerate the waste can be derived from electricity, fuel, oil, or liquified petroleum gas. They are relatively energy inefficient because of the fuel used.

== History ==
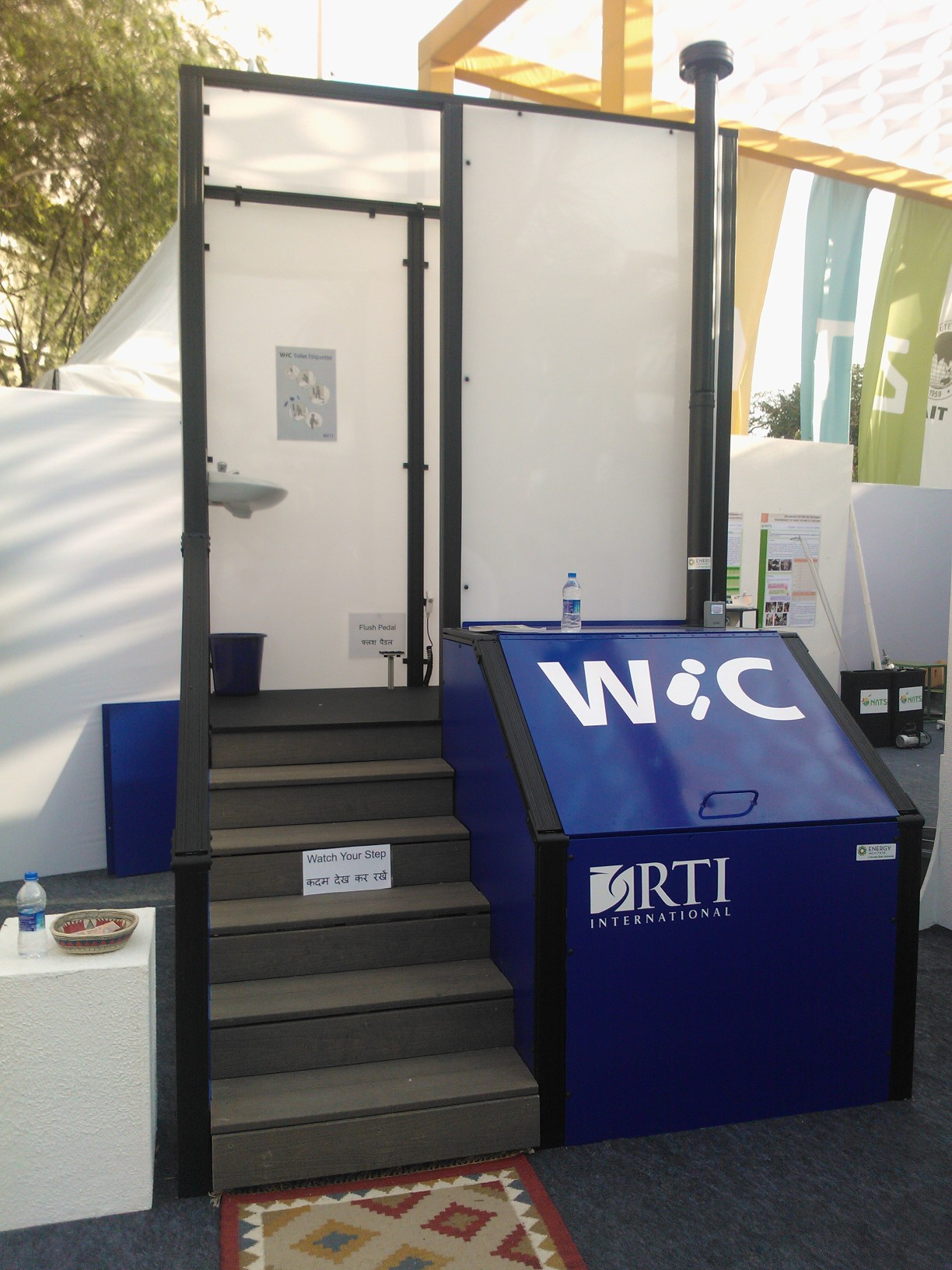
Example of incineration toilet under development by RTI International. The blue section to the right contains some of the drying and combustion components.

The first commercially successful incinerating toilet was the Destroilet, patented in 1946. Destroilets were used on ships in the 1960s when laws were passed to prevent the dumping of raw sewage into American waterways.

In 2011, the Bill & Melinda Gates Foundation launched the "Reinvent the Toilet Challenge" to promote safer, more effective ways to treat human excreta. Several research teams have received funding to work on developing toilets based on solid waste combustion. For example, a toilet under development by RTI International is based on electrochemical disinfection and solid waste combustion. This technology converts feces into burnable pieces and then uses thermoelectric devices to convert the thermal energy into electrical energy.

== Design ==
Incinerating toilets may be powered by electricity, gas, dried feces or other energy sources. Incinerating toilets gather excrement in an integral ashpan and then incinerate it, reducing it to pathogen-free ash. Some will also incinerate "grey water" created from showers and sinks.

== Applications ==
Incinerating toilets are used only for niche applications, which include:

- Apartments with limited or difficult access to waste plumbing.
- Houses without access to drains, and where building a septic tank would be difficult or uneconomic.
- On yachts and canal barges, as an alternative to a blackwater holding tank, which needs to be pumped out occasionally.
- On mobile homes, recreational vehicles and caravans/(trailers).
