= Freezing toilet =

Type of toilet

A freezing toilet is a kind of dry toilet powered by electricity which freezes the content in a short time. Freezing toilets are powered by electricity, and are commonly plugged into a wall socket. They do not need water, pipes, ventilation or chemicals to work. The contents freeze in a short time, stopping bacteria from multiplying and minimising odours. The toilet needs to be emptied by hand, and the contents disposed of (usually via composting).

Some freezing toilets are portable, as they only access to a plug to work. The machine consumes about 40 watts of electricity.

Freezing toilets were developed in Sweden in the 1970s, but now most units are produced in Finland.
