= Treebog =

Type of toilet

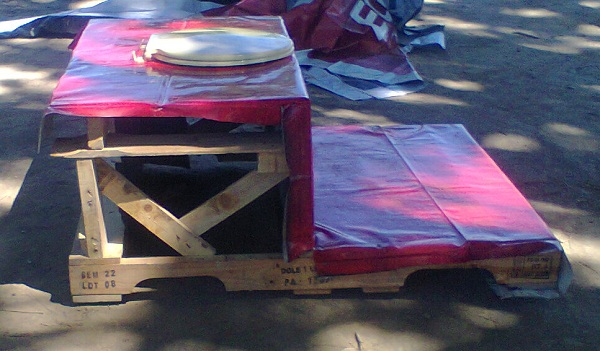
A treebog could be built with a bench-type seat, as in this arborloo, only there is no hole in the ground and it is raised one meter above the ground. The excrement is surrounded by a barrier of mesh, straw, and trees, such as willows.

A treebog is a type of low-tech compost toilet. It consists of a raised platform above a compost pile surrounded by densely planted willow trees or other nutrient-hungry vegetation. It can be considered an example of permaculture design, as it functions as a system for converting urine and feces to biomass, without the need to handle excreta.

Defecating in nature is frowned upon in most countries, as it pollutes the environment and causes health problems. High levels of open defecation are linked to high child mortality, poor nutrition, poverty, and large disparities between the rich and the poor. Human faeces normally take about a year to biodegrade outdoors. In the UK, a system like this is potentially legal, so long as it not in a public place, i.e. on a large private estate.

== Etymology ==
The term "Treebog" was coined by Jay Abrahams. Bog is a British English slang word for toilet, not to be confused with its other meaning of wetland.

== History ==
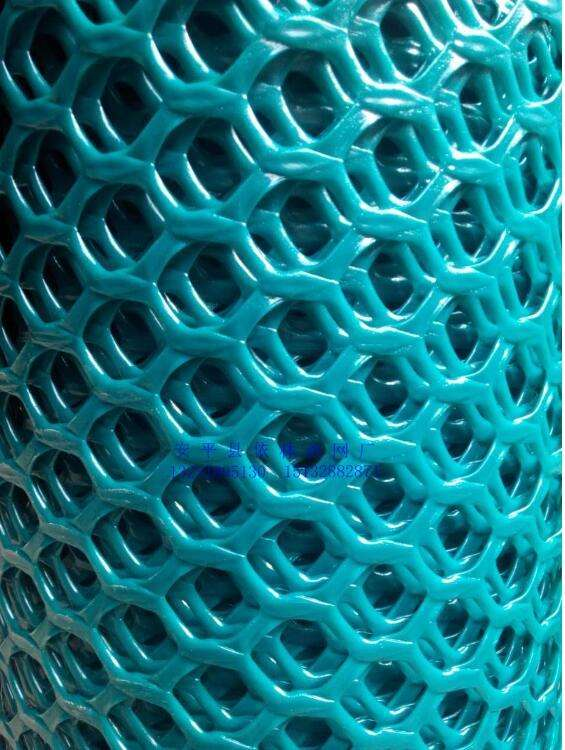
Plastic mesh would be preferable to avoid rust and the release of heavy metals. A mesh could potentially even be woven from strips cut from plastic bottles rescued from the garbage.

The treebog is a simple method of composting wastes. Abrahams claims that from 1995 to 2011, around 1500 treebogs may have been built in Britain.

In 2011, Abrahams claimed that the treebog had attracted the attention of NGOs and aid workers who hope to develop its potential for shanty towns or refugee camps - anywhere that water is scarce and the population pressure on resources is high.

== Plant growth ==
A treebog is simply a controlled compost heap whose function has been enhanced by use of moisture or nutrient-hungry trees. They use no water, purify waste as they create a biomass resource, and also contain the organic waste material, thus preventing the spread of disease.

The main requirement is that the planted species should be nutrient-hungry. It is a bonus if they can be harvested or pollarded for productive uses, e.g. willow cultivars. Apart from willows, mint will thrive around a treebog. If left unmanaged, a treebog will soon be surrounded by weed species, such as nettles.

Both the solids and liquids are deposited within the treebog base, where the solids compost and the liquids soak through the soil. The roots and associated mycorrhizal species allow the nitrogen to be absorbed. The faeces should be well ventilated to allow aerobic decomposition.

== Construction ==
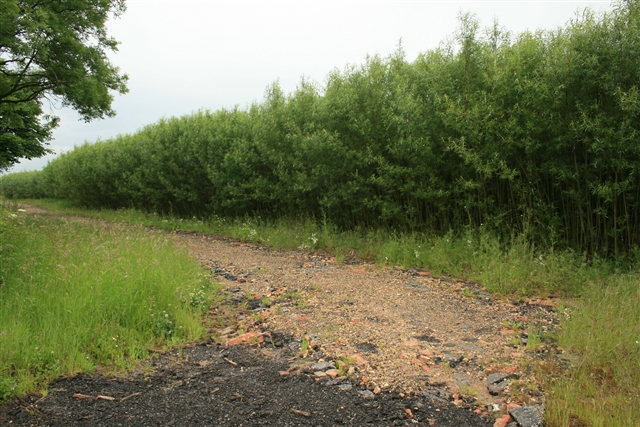
Coppiced willows or other species of trees help to contain the feces and create a place where they decompose quickly.

A seating platform/cubicle is mounted at least one meter high. The area beneath the seating platform is enclosed by two layers of chicken wire or plastic mesh, which act as an effective child-proof barrier and allows air to circulate through the compost heap. Plastic mesh or chicken wire coated in plastic would prevent problems with rusting.

Sawdust, straw, woodchip, ash or other high-carbon matter is used to cover the excrement and balance the high nitrogen content of the urine. One design uses bran to help mitigate the odours.

The space between the two layers of mesh is stuffed with straw, which acts as a wick to help sop up excess urine, preventing the likelihood of odour problems due to incomplete biological absorption of the nitrogen from the urine. The straw-filled wire also enables the pile to be well-aerated whilst acting as a visual screen for the first year’s use.

The structure is surrounded by two closely planted rows of Salix viminalis or other willow cuttings; this living wall of willow can then be woven into a hurdle-like structure and its annual growth can be harvested.

== See also ==
- Arborloo, a similar concept, in which excrement goes into a hole in the ground and, when the hole starts to fill, the outhouse is moved to another hole, and a tree is planted in the old hole.
- Ecological sanitation
- Reuse of excreta
- Urine-diverting dry toilet
