= GSP =

GSP may refer to:

== Places ==
=== Parks ===
- Gambrill State Park, Frederick, Maryland
- Garner State Park, Concan, Texas
- Garrapata State Park, California
- Gathland State Park, Burkittsville, Maryland
- Geneva State Park, Ashtabula County, Ohio

=== Transportation ===
- Garden State Parkway, a toll road in New Jersey
- Greenville–Spartanburg International Airport, in South Carolina
- Gurdaspur railway station, in Punjab, India

=== Other places ===
- Garden State Plaza, a shopping mall in New Jersey
- GSP Stadium in Nicosia, Cyprus

== People ==
- Georges St-Pierre, a retired Canadian mixed martial artist

== Arts, entertainment, and media ==
- Gazeta Sporturilor, a Romanian sports newspaper
- Glory Sound Prep, an album by artist Jon Bellion

== Companies and organizations ==
- Genealogical Society of Pennsylvania
- General Samaj Party, a political party in Punjab, India
- Geological Survey of Pakistan
- George Street Playhouse, in New Brunswick, New Jersey
- Girl Scouts of the Philippines, a scouting system
- Goodby, Silverstein & Partners, an American advertising agency
- Groupement sportif des pétroliers, the former name of an Algerian sports club group that included
  - GS Pétroliers (basketball)
  - GS Pétroliers (handball)
- Grup Servicii Petroliere, a Romanian oil and gas service company
- Guatemala Stove Project, a Canadian charity

== Law enforcement ==
- Georgia State Patrol, in Georgia, United States
- Georgia State Prison, in Georgia, United States
- Gibraltar Services Police

== Technology ==
- GPU System Processor, microcontroller used in Nvidia graphics processing units since the Turing architecture.
- Guardian Service Processor in Hewlett-Packard servers
- The Geometer's Sketchpad, educational software

== Other uses ==
- Generalized second-price auction
- Generalized System of Preferences, a preferential tariff system
- German Shorthaired Pointer, a breed of dog
- Good safety practice
- Gross state product
- Global Shipping Program, international delivery system used by eBay
- GSP-55, a ferry variant of the Soviet PT-76 amphibious light tank
- Kentucky Governor's Scholars Program
- Samsung Global Scholarship Program
- Walther GSP, a pistol
- Wasembo language, spoken in Madang Province, Papua New Guinea
