= Household air pollution =

Air pollution that is mostly caused by cooking with polluting fuels

Share deaths indoor pollution

Household Air Pollution (HAP) is a significant form of indoor air pollution (IAP) mostly relating to cooking and heating methods used in developing countries. Since much of the cooking is carried out with biomass fuel, in the form of wood, charcoal, dung, and crop residue, in indoor environments that lack proper ventilation, millions of people, primarily women and children face serious health risks. In total, about three billion people in developing countries are affected by this problem. The World Health Organization (WHO) estimates that cooking-related pollution causes 3.8 million annual deaths. The Global Burden of Disease study estimated the number of deaths in 2021 at 3.1 million. The problem is closely related to energy poverty and cooking.

Smoke from traditional household solid fuel combustion commonly contains a range of incomplete combustion products, including both fine and coarse particulate matter (e.g., PM_{2.5}, PM_{10}), carbon monoxide (CO), nitrogen dioxide (NO_{2}), sulfur dioxide (SO_{2}), and a variety of organic air pollutants.

Technology-based solutions to this problem tend to focus on the supply of improved cookstoves although behavioral changes can also be important.

== Problem description and scale ==
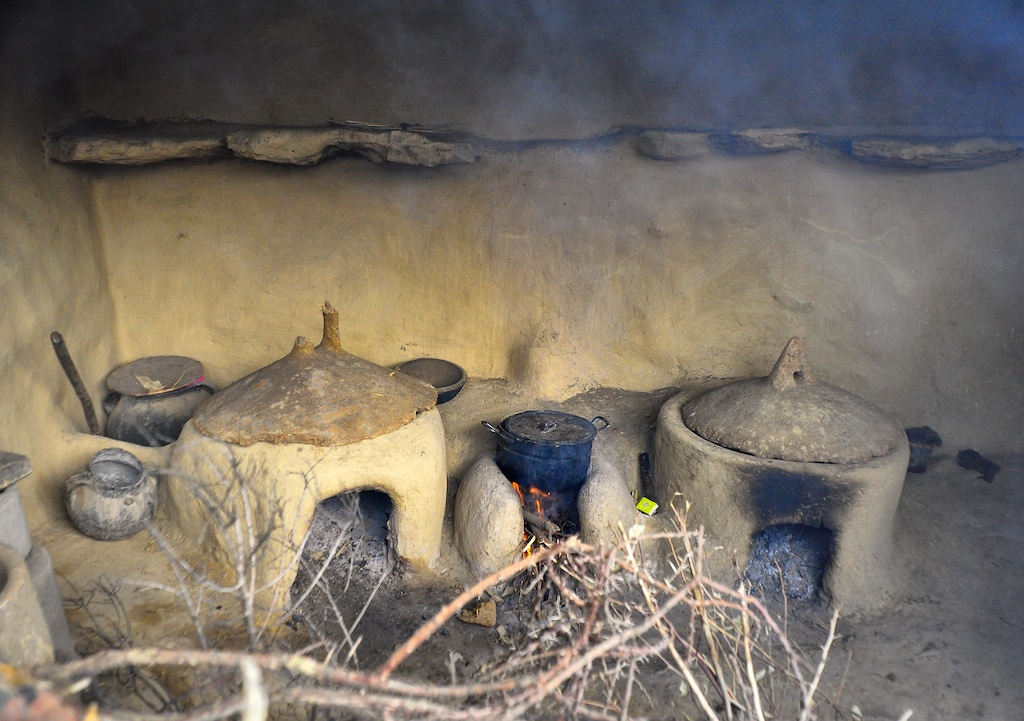
Traditional wood-burning stoves, causing household air pollution

Three billion people in developing countries rely on biomass fuel, in the form of wood, charcoal, dung, and crop residue, as their domestic cooking and heating fuel. Since much of the cooking is carried out indoors in environments that lack proper ventilation, millions of people, primarily women and children, face serious health risks from the inhalation of particulates. The major sources of indoor pollution include combustion and building materials. Globally, 4.3 million deaths were attributed to exposure to IAP in developing countries in 2012, almost all in low and middle-income countries. The South East Asian and Western Pacific regions bear most of the burden with 1.69 and 1.62 million deaths, respectively. Almost 600,000 deaths occur in Africa, 200,000 in the Eastern Mediterranean region, 99,000 in Europe and 81,000 in the Americas. The remaining 19,000 deaths occur in high-income countries.

Even though the rate of dependence on biomass fuel is declining, this dwindling resource will not keep up with population growth which could ultimately put environments at even greater risk.

Over the past several decades, there have been numerous studies investigating the air pollution generated by traditional household solid fuel combustion for space heating, lighting, and cooking in developing countries. It is now well established that, throughout much of the developing world, indoor burning of solid fuels (biomass, coal, etc.) by inefficient, often insufficiently vented, combustion devices results in elevated exposure to household air pollutants. This is due to the poor combustion efficiency of the combustion devices and the elevated nature of the emissions. In addition, they are often released directly into living areas. Smoke from traditional household solid fuel combustion commonly contains a range of incomplete combustion products, including both fine and coarse particulate matter (e.g., PM_{2.5}, PM_{10}), carbon monoxide (CO), nitrogen dioxide (NO_{2}), sulfur dioxide (SO_{2}), and a variety of organic air pollutants (e.g., formaldehyde, 1,3-butadiene, benzene, acetaldehyde, acrolein, phenols, pyrene, and cresols, among others). In a typical solid fuel stove, about 6–20% of the solid fuel is converted into toxic emissions (by mass). The exact quantity and relative composition is determined by factors such as the fuel type and moisture content, stove type and operation influencing the amount.

Indoor gas stoves have been linked to negative health effects such as an increase in childhood asthma.

== Health impacts ==
Most measurements have been focused on breathing-zone exposure levels of particulate matter (PM) and carbon monoxide (CO), which are the main products of incomplete combustion and are considered to pose the greatest health risks. Approximately 11% of lung cancer deaths in adults are attributed to exposure to carcinogens from household air pollution caused by using kerosene or solid fuels like wood, charcoal or coal for household energy needs. Indoor PM_{2.5} exposure levels have been consistently reported to be in the range of hundreds to thousands of micrograms per cubic meter (μg/m^{3}). Similarly, CO exposure levels have been measured to be as high as hundreds to greater than 1000 milligrams per cubic meter (mg/m^{3}). A recent study of 163 households in two rural Chinese counties reported geometric mean indoor PM_{2.5} concentrations of 276 μg/m^{3} (combinations of different plant materials, including wood, tobacco stems, and corncobs), 327 μg/m^{3} (wood), 144 μg/m^{3} (smoky coal), and 96 μg/m^{3} (smokeless coal) for homes using a variety of different fuel types and stove configurations (e.g., vented, unvented, portable, fire pit, mixed ventilation stove).

Rural Kenya has been the site of various applied research projects to determine the intensity of emissions that commonly occur from use of biomass fuels, particularly wood, dung, and crop residue. Smoke is the result of the incomplete combustion of solid fuel which women and children are exposed to up to seven hours each day in closed environments. These emissions vary by day, by season, and with airflow changes in a household. Exposure in poor homes far exceeds accepted safety levels by as much as one hundred times over. Because many Kenyan women utilize a three-stone fire, the worst offender, one kilogram of burning wood produces tiny particles of soot which can clog and irritate the bronchial pathways. The smoke also contains various poisonous gases such as aldehydes, benzene, and carbon monoxide. Exposure to IAP from the combustion of solid fuels has been implicated, with varying degrees of evidence, as a causal agent of several diseases. Acute lower respiratory infections (ALRI) and chronic obstructive pulmonary disease (COPD) are the leading causes of disease and death from exposure to smoke. Cataracts and blindness, lung cancer, tuberculosis, premature births and low birth weight are also suspected of being caused by IAP.

As of 2023, more than 2.3 billion people in developing countries rely on burning polluting biomass fuels such as wood, dry dung, coal, or kerosene for cooking, which causes harmful household air pollution and also contributes significantly to outdoor air pollution. The World Health Organization (WHO) estimates that cooking-related pollution causes 3.8 million annual deaths. The Global Burden of Disease study estimated the number of deaths in 2021 at 3.1 million, and the death rate is highest in Africa. Household air pollution from polluting cooking practices is associated with a wide range of adverse health outcomes. Exposure to fine particulate matter and toxic gases released during combustion has been linked to increased risks of stroke, pneumonia, and chronic respiratory conditions such as chronic obstructive pulmonary disease. In addition, exposure during pregnancy is associated with adverse birth outcomes, including low birth weight.

In traditional cooking facilities, smoke is typically vented into the home rather than through a chimney. Solid fuel smoke contains thousands of substances, many of which are hazardous to human health. The most well understood of these substances are carbon monoxide (CO); small particulate matter; nitrous oxide; sulfur oxides; a range of volatile organic compounds, including formaldehyde, benzene and 1,3-butadiene; and polycyclic aromatic compounds, such as benzo-a-pyrene, which are thought to have both short and long-term health consequences.

Exposure to household air pollution (HAP) nearly doubles the risk of childhood pneumonia and is responsible for 45 percent of all pneumonia deaths in children under five years of age. Emerging evidence shows that HAP is also a risk factor for cataracts, the leading cause of blindness in lower-middle-income countries, and low birth weight. Cooking with open fires or unsafe stoves is a leading cause of burns among women and children in developing countries.

=== Women and girls ===
Women and girls are largely responsible for collecting fuel-wood for cooking in most households, particularly in rural communities and in refugee camps. Women and girls also make up the majority of deaths from household air pollution. Replacing traditional kerosene/firewood stoves with cleaner ethanol stoves in Nigeria has mitigated adverse pregnancy outcomes from HAP. Anemia, a condition in which a woman's hemoglobin levels are drastically reduced, and pregnant women's exposure to CO seem to coincide with one another. A pregnant woman with anemia seem to develop higher levels of CO pollution than those who do not.

== Approaches ==
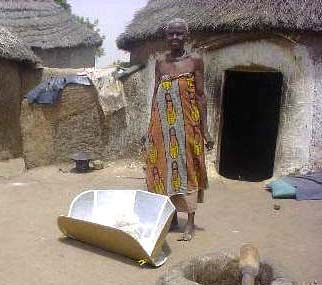
Solar cookers use sunlight as energy source for outdoor cooking.

=== Early interventions ===
Unfortunately, finding an affordable solution to address the many effects of IAP – improving combustion, reducing smoke exposure, improving safety and reducing labor, reducing fuel costs, and addressing sustainability – is complex and needs continual improvement. Efforts to improve cook stoves in the past, beginning in the 1950s, were primarily aimed at minimizing deforestation with no concern for IAP, though the effectiveness of these efforts to save firewood is debatable. Various attempts had various outcomes. For example, some improved stove designs in Kenya significantly reduced particulate emissions but produced higher CO_{2} and SO_{2} emissions. Flues to remove smoke were difficult to design and were fragile.

=== Improved success ===
Current improved interventions, however, include smoke hoods, which operate in much the same manner as flues to extract smoke but are found to reduce levels of IAP more effectively than homes that rely solely on windows for ventilation. Some features of newly improved stoves include a chimney, enclosing the fire to retain heat, designing a pot holder to maximize heat transfer, dampers to control airflow, a ceramic insert to reduce heat loss, and multi-pot systems for cooking multiple dishes.

Stove-related interventions are now known to be one of the least-cost means of achieving the combined objective of reducing the health burden of IAP and, in some areas, reducing environmental stress from biomass harvesting.

=== Sustainable energy options ===
Large-scale combustion of biomass is only feasible if carried out sustainably. The concern is paramount for the regeneration of renewable and sustainable fuel-wood sources if it is to continue to be available long-term. Attempts at sustainable solutions in Kenya could include developing energy crops (trees and shrubs) which would also provide additional income for farmers. This solution would benefit cropland or rangeland prone to erosion and flooding as the root systems and leaf litter would enhance soil stability. Careful selection of regenerating varieties would be most sustainable because soil stability is not disrupted due to tilling and planting. Some people view this solution as a way to further exploit forests, but with proper management of forest resources this could be a viable solution.

Fuels and cook stove technology can be assessed on two factors: energy efficiency and emissions in the household. High-performing efficient stoves can improve environmental outcomes to an extent even with unclean fuels (such as firewood and biomass). According to a study comparing environmental, social, and economic life cycle impacts of cooking fuels, with more efficient stoves "more of the heating value of the fuel is converted into useful cooking energy and therefore less fuel must be produced, transported, and burned to deliver the same amount of cooking".

Other sustainable options include liquid and gas fuels that are combusted in high-performing efficient stoves. For instance, ethanol produced from cellulosic/non-food feedstocks (wood, agricultural residue) has lower environmental life cycle impacts compared to ethanol produced from sugar and starch materials. LPG, though made from non-renewable fossil fuels, still has lower negative health impacts than traditional fuels. Thus, even though it is not a sustainable alternative, it creates far fewer emissions impacts than traditional fuels.

== Challenges ==
=== Supply ===
There exist trade-offs between efficiency and sustainability on the supply side of the cook stoves and fuels market. While developing cook stoves that use efficient and clean fuel sources is environmentally ideal, often this is not a viable solution due to barriers to scaling up production and consumption of these fuels. For instance, electric stoves are cited as emission-free 'clean' alternatives to biomass at the household level. However, negative externalities still exist – ambient air pollution in areas near power plants still poses a health risk, while the generation of electricity in India and China (countries largely dependent on coal for electricity generation) still poses significant environmental risks. Moreover, only households that are connected to the electric grid in a country or region will have access to electricity for household energy consumption, thereby excluding a large swathe of rural communities.

=== Demand ===
On the demand side, challenges exist in terms of creating an enabling environment for cook stove acquisition. Incorporating culturally sensitive behavior change techniques (BCTs) into demand interventions is necessary to foster large-scale behavior change, as discussed below. The other prohibitive aspect of cook stove interventions that do not involve paternalistic good provision is the high up-front costs of improved stoves. Consumers at the bottom of the income pyramid are often the target end-users of these improved technologies, but due to a lack of collateral or isolation, they do not have access to traditional forms of consumer finance and credit. Innovations in business models and the increased proliferation of microfinance institutions (MFIs) are addressing these issues – however, MFIs face challenges of scaling up.

=== Government intervention ===
Given the negative externalities associated with unclean cook stove technology – the negative impact on women and girls; lack of environmental sustainability; and increased risk of diseases associated with HAP – there is a strong case for government intervention. For instance, one form of intervention could be direct subsidies linked to health and climate impacts – for example, targeted subsidies carbon markets. The provision of public goods such as consumer education, access to consumer finance would also be beneficial interventions. Subsidies towards investment in R&D for cleaner technologies and fuels, as well as for the implementation of a baseline standards and testing framework for cleanliness and efficiency (also provision of a public good), is necessary to create an effective and sustainable supply chain.

Government intervention is highly sought after for this current issue, so much so that many stakeholders for the World Health Organization, also known as WHO, have been called upon to discuss the health impacts caused by the presence of household air pollution in 2023. Focused primarily on Kenya, Dr. Abdurrahman Diallo called for a strike of action from government officials. Once again, the main focus is to purge the environment of significant levels of air pollution in households while raising green, clean energy. WHO has stated that more governmental outreach and intervention must be utilized if society wishes to clean up household air and remove the harmful particulate matter into this environment. However, this call to action has been filled with scientific findings supporting the health risks associated with household air pollution. There needs to be more framework to base a policy response for cleaner household air.

This call to action is put forth with a sense of urgency. For example, in Nairobi, Kenya, a large portion of the land mass is taken up by slums, neighborhoods that were rapidly built with little to no access to public services and goods Due to the poor state and condition of the population in this area, those in the slums typically stick to burning harsh woods and fossil fuels and are often located close to dumpsites, or even highways which can drastically impact household air pollution through open windows, cracks in the walls and ceilings, and poor insulation. However, due to this issue regarding the structure and ruling over the population, several stakeholders, including decision-makers (local), policymakers, and non-governmental figures, are considering many interventions through a dynamic system of workshop participants. During these workshops, these minds joined together and discussed the issues at hand, precisely issues regarding HAP, explored through field trips to discuss the problem with the community, and began a system that combined several key members of the government as well as individuals from the community to work together to solve the problem at hand.

=== Global Governance Partners ===
*The lack of a framework has not negated the ability to take environmental political action. The skyrocketing levels of household air pollution and their connection to health effects have led to the presence of governmental partners taking action to reverse the adverse reactions brought on by HAP. The call for cleaner energy systems for all households has been brought forth by donor states, WHO, and the Global Alliance for Clean Cookstoves (GACC). Several strategies have been brought into play, increasing supply and demand for cleaner household cooking appliances and making the everyday environment more suitable for these new interventions. Those who offer several standardized household energy, health, and air quality indicators in Burning Opportunity ⠀hold the potential to transform HAP-oriented policy reforms and allow the ability to hold international accountability in states that are not up to par with such policies. Also, WHO has increasing evidence regarding household air pollution and has their results available in the WHO Global Household Air Pollution Measurement Databases.

In May 2011, the international workshop " Health Burden of Indoor Air Pollution on Women and Children In Developing Countries" convened over 150 individuals to review science regarding the impact of exposure to air pollution. This was led by the National Institutes of Health and identified many different research priorities that will significantly contribute to fighting household air pollution.

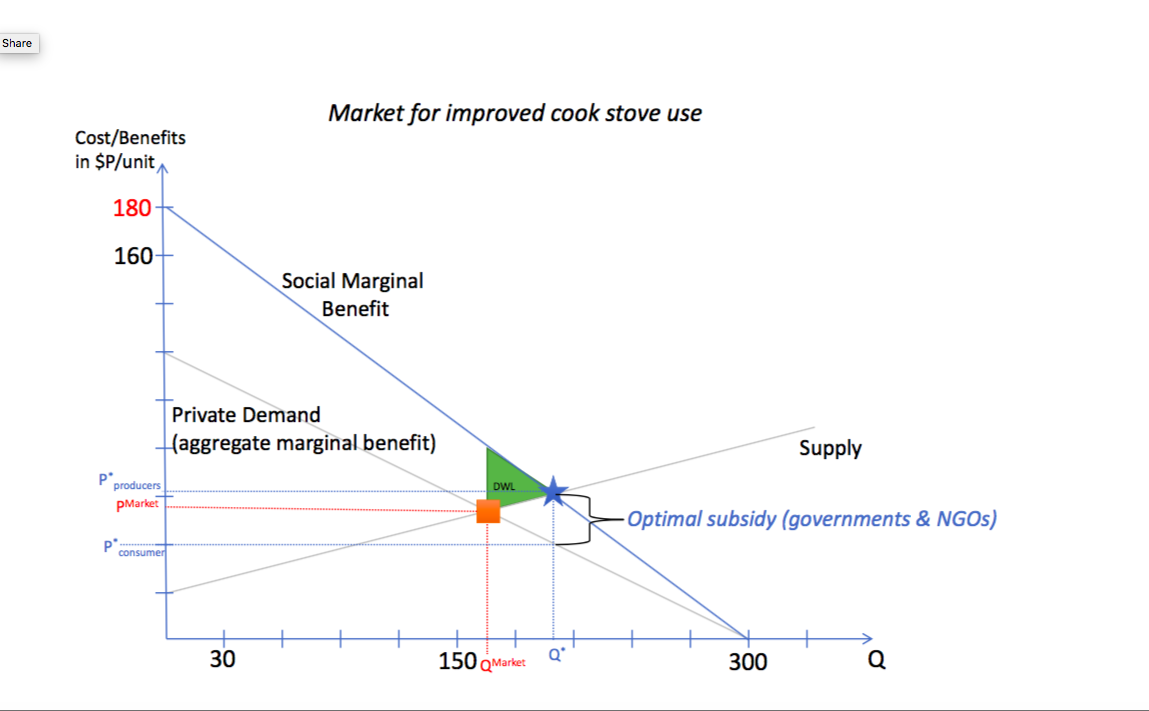
Positive consumption externalities from improved cook stove use, justifying external intervention

== Developments for improved cookstoves ==
There have been significant developments in energy efficient cooking solutions (improved cookstoves), such as the Wonderbag, which can also significantly reduce fuel requirements for residential cooking. Improvements in technology have allowed for the use of more sustainable cooking solutions with traditional fuels, such as the BioLite Home Stove, a biomass stove which reduces fuel consumption by 50% and emissions by up to 95%.

Innovations in business models have also allowed for cook stove suppliers to "dramatically improve both manufacturer and end-user economics, while achieving high levels of health and environmental benefits". For instance, Inyeneri is a for-profit energy company in Rwanda that operates as more as a 'cooking fuel utility company'. Its model addresses a number of problems with stove adoption including prohibitively high upfront stove costs, consumer tendency to combine new and old cooking solutions, and lack of commercial viability of these enterprises.

Additionally, innovations in mobile technology have allowed companies like PayGo Energy in Kenya and KopaGas in Tanzania to overcome the cost barrier that low-income consumers face, including the high up-front cost of stoves and the inaccessibility of purchasing fuels in small quantities (a form of the poverty penalty). MFIs have also begun to turn their attention to clean energy access, as seen with the success of the USAID-funded Renewable Energy Microfinance and Microenterprise Program (REMMP).

National and international effort must be stepped up to advance short and long-term solutions for the millions of women and children who suffer from poverty and disease as a result of indoor air pollution. Scientists predict the African continent will be the first to experience the effects of global warming where widespread poverty will put millions at further risk due to their limited capabilities to adapt. The potential is great for a more sustainable Africa with commitment from within and outside the region. Pneumonia is the number one killer of children in the world and indoor air pollution is a strongly significant risk factor for severe pneumonia. The global health community designated 2 November to be World Pneumonia Day in order to raise awareness about the disease and its causes.

=== Monitoring Cookstoves ===
The presence of improved cookstoves is a step in the appropriate direction, but they lack the desired levels of use to obtain the desired results of its use. Improved cookstove programs are considered a short-term option for fighting the presence of indoor air pollution. The program's effectiveness is often surveyed and examined by the presence of sensors, thought to accurately track and monitor its effectiveness by officials. These sensors revealed that the average use for these improvised cookstoves is around two months, with a few studies revealing a small collection of uses that lasted for at least six months. Ultimately, there is an increasing need due to the presence of climate change and the effects of air pollution on it for more long-term studies, due to these short monitoring sessions being unreliable and lacking the availability to accurately capture data and represent cookstoves' effectiveness and usefulness.

== Education and behavior change techniques ==
Educational intervention can contribute to reducing exposure to smoke by implementing behaviour change techniques that alert people to the dangers and encourage a willingness to alter living and cultural practices which could have a significant impact on mitigating exposure to IAP. Behaviour change is one aspect of influencing demand that can be achieved through targeted social marketing campaigns, which are usually of two types: either mass-market campaigns or focused approaches at the local and household level that employ demonstrations and follow up visits. Studies show that mass marketing campaigns do in fact increase awareness of risks of household air pollution, but are often unsuccessful in raising purchases of improved stoves.

Design of these interventions must be undertaken with the knowledge that "consumer needs and preferences are complex and are influenced by many contextual and social factors that require a deep understanding of culture, going beyond technology and economics". These factors include intra-gender issues, felt needs, cultural significance of food, and religious and cultural beliefs. Evidence of one successful government intervention was revealed by China who, between 1980 and 1995, disseminated 172 million improved cookstoves. This effort proved more successful due to the inclusion of local users, particularly women, who were involved in the design and fieldwork process.

== Primary intervention for children ==
Children up to five years of age spend 90% of their time at home. Globally, 50% of pneumonia deaths among children under five years of age are due to particulate matter inhaled from indoor air pollution. Many homes around the world used solid fuels for cooking. These fuels release large amounts of carbon monoxide and fine particulate matter. These chemical irritants when inhaled may cause different pulmonary conditions ranging from pulmonary epithelial cancer or acute pulmonary tract infection. Using commercial cooking fuels is a much cleaner and more efficient way to cook without causing an immense buildup of indoor air pollution. Kerosene, gas, and electricity have a much lower prevalence of asthma among children (8.3%) than in households that burn biomass (46.6-48.8%). However, the implementation of clean air intervention that involves constant intervention and constraints in air pollution exposure may be the most viable and possible effort to combat and intervene with childhood HAP illnesses and disabilities truly.

== Country examples ==
=== Kenya ===
As of 2004, Kenya has shown a willingness to undertake biomass energy issues with the understanding that consumption is associated with indoor air pollution and environmental degradation. Suggestions from the United Nations Development Programme include establishing an institution that will deal exclusively with biomass energy by developing policy guidelines on sustainable firewood, charcoal, and modern biomass such as cleaner fuels and wind, solar, and small scale hydropower. Short-term solutions rest in more efficient domestic energy use by way of improved cook stoves which provide more affordable options in the near future than a complete shift to nonsolid fuels. Long-term solutions rest on transition to modern cleaner fuels and alternative energy sources within a broad international and national policy and economic agenda. Government support for long-term solutions is feasible as witnessed by current efforts in Zambia to develop policy to promote biofuels.

Kenya is the world leader in the number of solar power systems installed per capita (but not the number of watts added). More than 30,000 small solar panels, each producing 12 to 30 watts, are sold in Kenya annually. For an investment of as little as $100 for the panel and wiring, the PV system can be used to charge a car battery, which can then provide power to run a fluorescent lamp or a small television for a few hours a day. More Kenyans adopt solar power every year than make connections to the country's electric grid.

The following information represents one successful intervention known as the Kenya Smoke and Health Project (1998–2001) which involved fifty rural households in two separate regions, Kajiado and West Kenya. These areas were chosen due to different climate, geographic, and cultural implications. Community participation was the primary focus for this project and as a result, those involved indicated the results far exceeded their expectations. Local women's groups and, in the case of the project in West Kenya, men were actively involved. By involving the end-users the project resulted in more widespread acceptance and created the further benefit of providing local income.

Three key interventions were discussed and disseminated; ventilation by enlarging windows or opening eaves spaces, adding smoke hoods over the cooking area, or the option of installing an improved cook stove such as the Upesi stove. Smoke hoods are free-standing units that act like flues or chimneys in their effort to draw smoke out of the dwelling. They can be used over traditional open fires and this study showed they contribute to considerably lower levels of IAP. The smoke hood models were made with hard manila paper and then transferred to heavy-gauge galvanized sheet metal and manufactured locally. This resulted in further employment opportunities for the artisans who were trained by the project. The Upesi stove, made of clay and kiln-fired, was developed by Practical Action and East African partners to utilize wood and agricultural wastes. Because this stove was designed and adapted for local needs it produced several winning features. Not only does it cut the use of fuel-wood by approximately half, and reduce exposure to household smoke, it also empowers local women by creating employment as they are the ones who make and market the stoves. These women's groups gain access to technical training in production and marketing and enjoy higher wage earnings and improved social status as a result of the introduction of this improved stove.

Various benefits were realized including improved health; the most important aspect to each of the villagers involved. The people reported less internal heat allowing for better sleep, fewer headaches and less fatigue, less eye irritation and coughs and dizziness. Safety increased due to the smoke hoods preventing goats and children from falling into the fire and less soot contamination was observed, along with snakes and rodents not entering the home. Windows allowed for the ability to view cattle from indoors, and also reduced kerosene needs due to improved interior lighting. Overall, the indoor environment improved greatly from various simple things that are taken for granted in modern western homes. Greater indoor light also allows for more income generation for women as they can do beadwork by the window when weather does not allow for this work outdoors. Children also benefit from increased lighting for homework.

Interpersonal relationships developed among the women due to the project, and men better supported their wives initiative when the result benefited them as well. While initial efforts to improve stoves were limited in success, current efforts are more successful due to the recognition that sustainable domestic energy resources are "central to reducing poverty and hunger, improving health...and improving the lives of women and children" The optimal short-term goal in minimizing rural poverty is to provide inexpensive and acceptable solutions to the local people. Not only can stoves contribute to this intervention, but the use of cleaner fuels will also provide further benefits.

=== Guatemala ===
Similar improved-stove projects have proven successful in other regions of the world. Improved stoves installed as part of the Randomized Exposure Study of Pollution Indoors and Respiratory Effects (RESPIRE) study in Guatemala were found to be acceptable to the population and produce significant health benefits for both mothers and children. Mothers in the intervention group had lower blood pressure and reductions in eye discomfort and back pain. Intervention households were also found to have lower levels of small particles and carbon monoxide. Children in these households also had lower rates of asthma. This initial pilot program has evolved into CRECER (Chronic Respiratory Effects of Early Childhood Exposure to Respirable Particulate Matter), which will attempt to follow children in intervention households for a longer period of time to determine whether the improved stoves also contribute to greater health over the lifespan.

=== India ===
The National Program on Improved Chulhas in India has also had some success in encouraging the use of improved stoves among at-risk populations. Begun in the mid-1980s, this program provides subsidies to encourage families to purchase the longer-lasting chulhas and have a chimney installed. A 2005 study showed that stoves with chimneys are associated with a lower incidence of cataracts in women. Much of the available information from India is more of a characterization of the issue and there is less data available from intervention trials.

=== China ===
China has been particularly successful at encouraging the use of improved stoves, with hundreds of millions of stoves installed since the beginning of the project in the early 1980s. The government very intentionally targeted poorer, rural households, and by the late 1990s nearly 75% of such households contained "improved kitchens". A 2007 review of 3500 households showed an improvement in indoor air quality in intervention households characterized by lower concentrations of small particles and carbon monoxide in household air. The program in China involved intervention on a large scale, but the cost of stoves was heavily subsidized so it is not known if its success could be replicated. However, an issue with transparency from China's government regarding their air pollution levels has been a key issue in assessing the actual damage and issues related to the public's health and thoughts about their air quality. With the increased use of wide stream media and the internet, the public population of China has become increasingly aware of the air pollution problems that they face both indoors and outdoors, driving the public to focus on environmental action to combat air pollution. China is an example of an environmental problem such as air pollution breaking through to a public community with transparent information to take action and drive a reaction from their government officials.

== See also ==
- Air filter
- Energy poverty and cooking
- Envirofit
- Guatemala Stove Project
- Rocket stove
- Rural electrification
- Sick building syndrome
- Renewable energy in China
