= Asthma =

Long-term inflammatory disease of the airways of the lungs

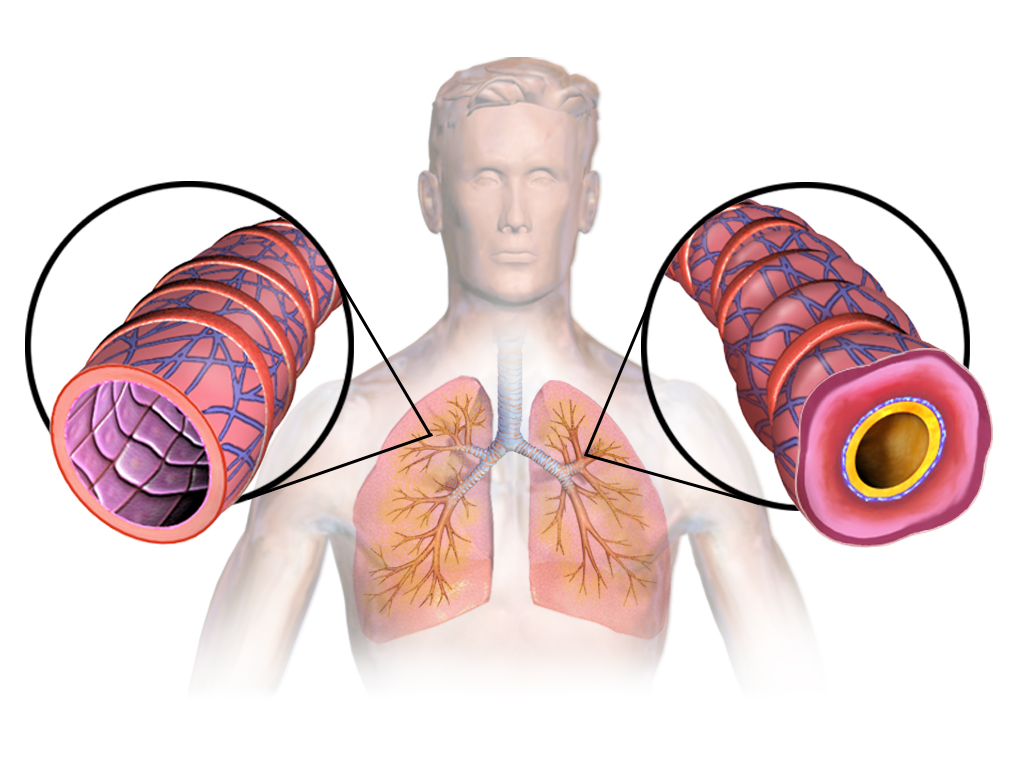
- During an asthma attack, the airways become swollen and full of mucus.
- Pronunciation: UK: /ˈæsmə, ˈæsθmə/; US: /ˈæzmə/
- Specialty: Pulmonology
- Symptoms: Recurring episodes of wheezing, coughing, chest tightness, shortness of breath
- Complications: Gastroesophageal reflux disease (GERD), sinusitis, obstructive sleep apnea
- Usual onset: Childhood
- Duration: Long term
- Causes: Genetic and environmental factors
- Risk factors: Air pollution, allergens, urban environments
- Diagnostic method: Based on symptoms and spirometry
- Treatment: Avoiding triggers, inhaled corticosteroids and long-acting beta2 agonists
- Frequency: Approximately 363 million (2023)
- Deaths: Approximately 442,000 (2023)

Asthma is a common long-term inflammatory disease of the airways. It is characterized by variable and recurring symptoms and reduced lung function. Symptoms include episodes of wheezing, coughing, chest tightness, and shortness of breath. A sudden worsening of asthma symptoms sometimes called an asthma attack or an asthma exacerbation can occur when allergens, pollen, dust, or other particles are inhaled into the lungs, causing the bronchioles to constrict and produce mucus, which then restricts oxygen flow to the alveoli. These may occur a few times a day or a few times per week. Depending on the person, asthma symptoms may become worse at night or with exercise.

Asthma is thought to be caused by a combination of genetic and environmental factors. Environmental factors include exposure to air pollution and allergens. Other potential triggers include medications such as aspirin and beta blockers. Diagnosis is usually based on the pattern of symptoms, response to therapy over time, and spirometry lung function testing. Asthma is classified according to the amount of medication required to control symptoms or mechanisms underlying the condition.

There is no known cure for asthma, but it can be controlled. Symptoms can be prevented by avoiding triggers, such as allergens and respiratory irritants, and suppressed with the use of inhaled corticosteroids. Long-acting beta agonists (LABA) or antileukotriene agents may be used in addition to inhaled corticosteroids if asthma symptoms remain uncontrolled. Treatment of rapidly worsening symptoms is usually with an inhaled short-acting beta_{2} agonist such as salbutamol, corticosteroids taken by mouth, and oxygen therapy. In very severe cases, intravenous corticosteroids and hospitalization may be required.

In 2023, asthma affected an estimated 363 million people worldwide and caused 442,000 deaths. Most asthma-related deaths occur in low- and lower-middle-income countries. Asthma often begins in childhood. It was recognized as early as ancient Egypt. The word asthma is from the Greek ἆσθμα (âsthma), which means 'panting'.

== Signs and symptoms ==
Wheezing
The sound of wheezing as heard with a stethoscope

Asthma causes recurrent episodes of wheezing, shortness of breath, chest tightness, and coughing. Symptoms are usually worse at night and in the early morning or in response to exercise or cold air. Some people with asthma rarely experience symptoms, usually in response to triggers, whereas others may react frequently and experience persistent symptoms.

=== Associated conditions ===
Asthma is often associated with other conditions both within and outside of the respiratory system. Comorbid medical conditions are more common in severe asthma and can affect the disease severity, symptoms and treatment. Common comorbid conditions include allergic diseases (allergic conjunctivitis and rhinitis), chronic obstructive pulmonary disease (COPD), exercise-induced bronchoconstriction, bronchiectasis, obstructive sleep apnea, obesity, gastroesophageal reflux disease, diabetes, heart disorders, and mental health conditions such as anxiety and depression.

== Classification ==
Due to the diversity in onset, symptoms, outcomes, and response to treatment, asthma is often considered a syndrome—a collection of signs and symptoms—rather than a single condition. Historically asthma was classified as being caused by external factors (extrinsic) such as allergens or by internal factors (intrinsic), unrelated to allergies. Asthma is most commonly classified according to severity, control of symptoms, phenotypes and endotypes.

Asthma and chronic obstructive pulmonary disease (COPD) cause airway restriction and have a wide range of overlapping mechanisms and symptoms. The main difference between the two disorders is that in asthma expiratory airflow fluctuates over time while in COPD airflow obstruction is chronic and often increases in severity over time.

=== Severity and symptom control ===
Asthma severity is determined on the basis of how much medication is required to control symptoms and exacerbations. Asthma control is the burden of asthma on an individual such as symptoms and inflammation. Classification of asthma control does not depend on medication usage like severity does, however they often assess similar factors.

Asthma control is assessed based on how well the symptoms are being controlled and future risk of consequences of the disorder. The frequency and severity of symptoms, impairment caused by symptoms, use of rescue inhalers, questionnaires, healthcare usage, and objective tests such as spirometry, FeNO, sputum eosinophils, and hyperresponsiveness studies are used to evaluate asthma control.

Asthma severity is measured based on how difficult the disorder is to treat. Severity can only be measured once the disorder is under control. Those with mild asthma may only require as needed medication to treat the disease while those with severe asthma require high doses of medication to gain control over the disorder or may be unable to get their symptoms under control even with medications.

=== Phenotyping and endotyping ===
A phenotype is the way in which a condition presents itself, such as when the disease first starts to affect a person and what symptoms an individual displays. An endotype is the mechanisms that underlie the condition. Asthma is most commonly divided into two endotypes, T2-high and T2-low (non-T2). Within the two main endotypes there are subpopulations (phenotypes), some of which overlap or can be categorized under both of the two endotypes.

The two endotypes are distinguished based on the type of inflammation present, with the type-2 high endotype involving the type 2 immune system response and type-2 low involving type 1 immune system response. Type-2 high is characterized by increased eosinophils, increased Fractional exhaled nitric oxide (FeNO), or allergens. Type-2 low asthma is the absence of these inflammatory markers and the mechanisms are not well researched. The phenotypes included under the type-2 high endotype include early-onset allergic asthma, late-onset eosinophilic asthma, and Aspirin-exacerbated respiratory disease. Type-2 low asthma phenotypes include asthma associated with obesity, neutrophilic asthma, asthma associated with cigarette smoke, and paucigranulocytic asthma. Occupational asthma can be further split into separate phenotypes, irritant-induced asthma—caused by exposure to airway irritants such as cleaning products and dust—and sensitizer-induced occupational asthma—developed hypersensitivity. Irritant-induced asthma is a type-2 low phenotype while sensitizer-induced occupational asthma is a type-2 high phenotype. Asthma-COPD overlap (ACO) lacks a consistent definition making it hard to categorize it into either endotype.

=== Asthma exacerbation ===
An asthma exacerbation, commonly referred to as an asthma attack, asthma episode, or acute severe asthma are episodes of increased symptoms (shortness of breath, wheezing, coughing, chest tightness), and decreased lung function. Decreased lung function is measured by peak expiratory flow rate (PEF) or forced expiratory volume in 1 second.

Signs occurring during an asthma exacerbation include the use of accessory muscles of respiration (sternocleidomastoid and scalene muscles), chest retractions with breathing, blue colour of the skin and nails, increased heart rate and changes in respiratory sounds.

An asthma exacerbation is considered mild when there is difficulty carrying out daily activities due to symptoms and a decrease of at least 20% in PEF for over two days. In moderate exacerbations, oxygen desaturation is mild, there is no use of auxiliary respiratory muscles, and there is a 50% or lower decrease in PEF. During severe exacerbations, the person experiencing symptoms becomes restless and may struggle to speak; oxygen saturation drops and there is above a 50% decrease in PEF. Life-threatening exacerbations cause lethargy and clouding of consciousness.

Brittle asthma is a kind of asthma distinguishable by recurrent, severe attacks. However, brittle asthma is best regarded as a historical disease descriptor rather than a distinct diagnostic category. While it remains useful for understanding older literature it is no longer routinely used in contemporary clinical practice.

== Causes ==
Asthma is caused by a mixture of genetic and external factors. The disease manifests when those with a genetic susceptibility to asthma are exposed to specific environmental factors. Environmental factors can also trigger asthma symptoms.

=== Risk factors ===
Factors during pregnancy that have been linked to the development of asthma include weight gain or obesity in the mother, stressful pregnancy, smoking while pregnant, the use of certain medications while pregnant and caesarean section. Early childhood exposure to secondhand smoke, high levels of stress in parents, respiratory infections, and indoor mold or fungi have also been associated with asthma development. Prenatal or childhood exposure to cigarette smoke increases the likelihood of a child developing asthma. Children whose maternal grandmother smoked during pregnancy are also more likely to develop asthma, regardless of if their mothers developed asthma or smoked. Nicotine is believed to be the cause of these effects and nicotine is linked to changes in DNA.

Respiratory tract infections, especially during early childhood or if they are severe and recurring can lead to decreased lung function and subsequent asthma. Conversely, there has been research suggesting that certain infections during childhood may lessen the risk of developing asthma. This theory is known as the "hygiene hypothesis".

Chronic exposure to air pollution increases the risk of developing asthma. Outdoor air pollution includes nitrogen dioxide and traffic pollution while indoor air pollution includes biomass, pesticides, building materials such as asbestos and formaldehyde, mold, dust mites, cockroaches, and endotoxins. Data from a variety of countries worldwide suggests that respiratory outcomes can be improved through implementation of policies to reduce air pollution.

Asthma is more commonly seen in urban environments than in rural environments. This is believed to be due to the higher presence of certain risk factors for asthma in urban settings such as traffic pollution, secondhand smoke, social inequality, lack of green spaces, and industrialization as well as protective factors associated with rural environments such as less air pollution, early protective exposure to allergens and bacteria, and higher levels of physical activity.

In those who are affected by allergies, exposure to allergens can trigger asthma symptoms. However, some research has suggested that early exposure to allergens in childhood may help desensitize individuals from allergies. Other studies have shown that early exposure may increase risk of allergies and the development of allergies is multifactorial. Food allergies and atopic dermatitis in early childhood have been associated with an increased risk of developing asthma as a part of the atopic march. Allergens also play a role in the development of adult-onset asthma.

Adult-onset asthma is caused by relations between genetics, lifestyle factors such as obesity and smoking, and environmental factors such as an urban or rural environment, occupational exposures, and air pollution. Unlike childhood asthma, which is more prevalent in males, in adults asthma is more prevalent in females. Over 400 occupational exposure have been linked to asthma. Exposure to asthmagens, allergens and substances that are known to cause asthma; the amount and length of time that an individual was exposed to the substance; genetics; allergies; and smoking can affect the development of occupational asthma.

=== Genetics ===
Asthma is highly polygenic, with hundreds of common and rare genetic variants of small effect contributing to disease susceptibility, age of onset, and inflammatory phenotypes. Twin studies and family studies support a substantial heritable component, with estimates that roughly half or more of asthma susceptibility is explained by genetics that is further modulated by environmental and epigenetic factors. Large genome-wide association studies (GWAS) and sequencing efforts indicate that risk reflects the cumulative effects of numerous common genetic variants together with a more limited contribution from rare variants, rather than a small number of loci of large effect.

Meta-analyses report over 200 genome-wide significant susceptibility loci, many mapping to immune and epithelial genes and explaining a measurable, though still incomplete, fraction of heritability. Pathway analyses consistently highlight type 2 inflammation, epithelial barrier function, and both innate and adaptive immune signalling, including loci near or within IL33, IL1RL1/IL18R1, TSLP, MHC class II, and GATA3. The chromosome region 17q12–21 remains the most robustly replicated asthma locus, with effects strongest for childhood-onset disease. Multiple genes in this region, including ORMDL3 and GSDMB, appear to act primarily through regulatory mechanisms, with gene-environment interactions and age-dependent effects on airway epithelial responses, particularly to early-life viral infections.

Genetic correlation analyses demonstrate substantial overlap between asthma and other atopic disorders such as eczema and allergic rhinitis, as well as with lung function traits. Multi-trait studies identify shared risk genes across asthma, hay fever, and eczema, supporting partially common pathways involving type 2 immunity and epithelial barrier dysfunction. Consistent with this architecture, polygenic risk scores (PRS) derived from multi-ancestry GWAS can stratify individuals by asthma risk, with higher predictive performance for childhood-onset than adult-onset disease. Individuals in the highest PRS percentiles show several-fold increased odds of childhood asthma, and PRS analyses have helped delineate heterogeneity across asthma–COPD overlap and related comorbid traits, although clinical implementation remains investigational.

Many asthma-associated variants act within regulatory elements, with effects that are highly cell-type specific and modulated by environmental exposures such as allergens, air pollution, and respiratory infections. Integrative genomic and epigenomic studies show enrichment of risk alleles in enhancers active in airway epithelial and immune cells, and indicate that DNA methylation and other epigenetic modifications mediate part of the gene-environment interaction underlying asthma susceptibility and phenotypic heterogeneity.

=== Exacerbations ===
Asthma exacerbations are commonly triggered by external factors or underusage of inhaled corticosteroid medications, however exacerbations can be sudden and unexplained. Triggers for asthma exacerbations include viral respiratory infections, exposure to allergens, food allergies, outdoor air pollution, season changes or back to school season in the fall, lack of adherence to inhaled corticosteroids, and epidemics of severe asthma exacerbations in a community.

== Mechanism ==
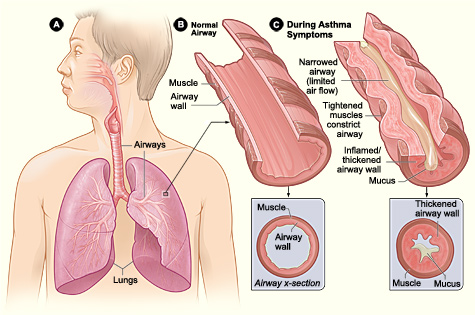
Figure A shows the location of the lungs and airways in the body. Figure B shows a cross-section of a normal airway. Figure C shows a cross-section of an airway during asthma symptoms.

The mechanisms underlying asthma and asthma symptoms include spasms in the bronchial muscles, inflammation in the airways, hypersensitive airways, and excessive secretion of mucus in the airways. Asthma mainly affects medium-sized airways, however small or large airways may also be affected as the condition progresses. Airway inflammation is consistent across everyone with asthma, regardless of symptoms. The cells involved in the inflammation seen in asthma include eosinophils, neutrophils, CD4 T lymphocytes, mast cells, basophils, macrophages, respiratory epithelium, endothelial, and smooth muscle cells. Airway inflammation leads to structural changes in the airways, including thickening of the airway smooth muscle and the tissue beneath the lining. There is increased tissue and matrix buildup in the airway wall, along with more small blood vessels and nerve fibers. The glands that produce mucus also increase in size.

In asthma, the airways contract more than what is normal in response to both internal and external triggers. This hyperresponsiveness alongside inflammation affects the nerves in the airways—making them more sensitive—and causes the body to produce too much mucus. Contraction of airway smooth muscle, swelling (edema), thickening of the airway wall due to remodelling, increased mucus production, and mucus plugs contribute to narrowing of the airways. Airway hyperresponsiveness is excessive narrowing of the airways in response to stimuli that are normally harmless. This narrowing leads to variable airflow restriction and asthma symptoms. Airway hyperresponsiveness is somewhat reversible with treatment.

== Diagnosis ==
Diagnostic guidelines for asthma vary in regards to what testing should be done to confirm the diagnosis, when to test, and what criteria should be used for the diagnosis. The diagnosis cannot be made based on a single test and is instead made based on a combination of symptoms and respiratory function testing. Asthma guidelines advise using objective tests to confirm asthma in people with suggestive symptoms. Respiratory tests such as spirometry, bronchodilator reversibility (BDR) testing, and measuring changes in breathing flow over time (peak flow variability) are included in all major asthma guidelines.

Symptoms of wheezing, shortness of breath, chest tightness, and coughing that fluctuate according to time of day and exposure to triggers are characteristic of asthma. Personal or family history of allergic conditions can also help identify people with asthma. Asthma rarely presents with physical findings on examination unless the person is symptomatic. If someone is medically unwell or displays a high amount of symptoms before the diagnosis is confirmed, medical guidelines recommend treating the person before performing respiratory testing.

Global Initiative for Asthma (GINA) guidelines for children above five years of age and adults suggest confirming variable expiratory airflow in those who have symptoms suggestive of asthma. Variable expiratory airflow in asthma refers to fluctuations in lung function over time. Variation in lung function can be shown by spirometry testing, peak expiratory flow, or bronchial provocation testing.

The most accurate measurement of lung function is spirometry, which tests how much air a person can forcefully breathe out in one second (FEV1), FEV1 is then compared to the total amount of air exhaled after taking a deep breath (FEV1/FVC ratio). When testing for asthma, spirometry is performed twice; the first measurements are taken when the patient is not using any asthma medication and the second is taken after the administration of medication. An increase of FEV1 after taking asthma medication is indicative of asthma. If spirometry is not available then peak expiratory flow can be used to show variable lung function. GINA guidelines recommend testing how fast a person can breathe out (peak expiratory flow) twice a day for two weeks. Daily changes greater than 10% may suggest asthma.

Bronchial provocation testing measures how sensitive and reactive the airways are. During the test, substances such as inhaled methacholine, histamine, or inhaled mannitol as well as exercise and controlled rapid breathing are used to try to trigger airway narrowing. These tests can help identify asthma but are not specific, because airway sensitivity can also occur in other conditions like allergic rhinitis, cystic fibrosis, bronchopulmonary dysplasia, and COPD. A negative test result in someone not using inhaled corticosteroids (ICS) can help rule out asthma. However, a positive result does not always confirm asthma, so symptoms and other clinical findings must also be considered.

For adults, NICE guidelines recommend testing fractional exhaled nitric oxide (FeNO) and blood eosinophils as a first step. If FeNO or eosinophils are not elevated then they recommend testing bronchodilator reversibility (BDR) with spirometry or peak expiratory flow (PEF) if spirometry is not available. Finally, if testing remains inconclusive, bronchial challenge tests are recommended. Guidelines for children ages five to sixteen are similar to the adult guidelines aside from recommendations surrounding blood eosinophil count. For children ages five to sixteen NICE guidelines do not recommend blood eosinophil count as an initial test, but instead they recommend measuring blood eosinophil count, skin prick testing for dust mites, or total IgE levels if respiratory testing is inconclusive.

According to NICE guidelines, children younger than five should be treated for asthma if they have symptoms suggestive of the condition instead of undergoing testing. GINA has proposed a set of diagnostic criteria for asthma in those under the age of five. All three of the following criteria must be met:

1. More than two acute episodes of asthma symptoms or at least one episode of wheezing with asthma symptoms between episodes. Wheezing must be confirmed in at least one episode.
2. Lack of alternative explanation for symptoms.
3. Response to asthma medication during acute wheezing episodes.

=== Differential diagnosis ===
Several conditions mimic the symptoms of asthma and the differential diagnosis for asthma varies based on age. In children and young adults alternative explanation for asthma symptoms include post-nasal drip, hyperventilation, dysfunctional breathing, enlarged airways, Vocal cord dysfunction, heart conditions, infections (recurrent respiratory tract infections, chronic rhinosinusitis, persistent bacterial bronchitis, tuberculosis), mechanical conditions (inhaled foreign body aspiration, gastroesophageal reflux) and congenital conditions (cystic fibrosis, primary immunodeficiency, congenital heart disease, bronchopulmonary dysplasia, primary ciliary dyskinesia syndrome, tracheal disorders, and alpha1-antitrypsin deficiency). For older adults the differential diagnoses include medication-related cough, heart failure, lung embolism, interstitial lung disease, central airway obstruction, COPD, bronchitis, gastrointestinal reflux disease, recurrent respiratory infections, heart disease, and vocal cord dysfunction. Many of the potential differential diagnoses for asthma commonly co-occur with asthma as well.

== Prevention ==
The only methods of preventing asthma that have been endorsed by clinical guidelines are avoiding the use of broad-spectrum antibiotics in the first year of a child's life, eliminating exposure to tobacco smoke both in utero and following birth, appropriate assessment and treatment of vitamin D deficiency during pregnancy, and vaginal birthing when possible. Other proposed preventative measures such as dietary changes, breastfeeding, supplements, and early exposure to pets or other common allergens do not have enough evidence to support their effectiveness.

== Management ==
The goal of asthma management is to reduce symptoms minimize the risk of complications such as exacerbations, reduced lung function, and medication side effects. This is done by evaluating asthma control and the risk of exacerbation, providing education and guidance on how to manage the disease, finding triggers and ways to minimize them, and medication. Asthma control should be reviewed during doctors appointments so that treatment can be adjusted accordingly.

After a diagnosis of asthma is made the person receiving the diagnosis and their family should receive education about the disease and a plan for management. Education includes information about avoiding triggers, self monitoring of symptoms or peak expiratory flow, an asthma action plan, asthma control and treatment options. Asthma action plans include management options to prevent and treat exacerbations as well as how to modify treatment based on symptoms or seek additional medical care. School based education programs on how to manage asthma decrease hospitalizations for asthma in school-aged children.

=== Lifestyle modification ===
Non-medical strategies to manage asthma consist of avoiding exposure to triggers and management of factors that contribute to asthma severity or symptoms. Exposure to cigarette smoke, from smoking or second-hand smoke, negatively affects asthma control and it is therefore recommended for those with asthma to refrain from smoking and limit exposure to second-hand smoke. For those with occupational asthma, it is recommended that sensitizers and allergens at work be avoided. Due to the variety of potential allergens and the difficulty of eliminating exposure to allergens, the guidelines do not recommend that those with asthma avoid indoor or outdoor allergens. Certain medications such as Aspirin, beta-blockers, and nonsteroidal anti-inflammatory drugs (NSAIDs) can worsen asthma symptoms in some individuals. It is still considered safe for those with asthma to take these medications, unless they have caused adverse reactions in the past.

Guidelines encourage those with asthma to maintain a balanced and healthy diet due to benefits on overall wellbeing. Regular physical activity is encouraged for those with asthma due to its positive effects on overall health, however, it does not result in any direct improvement in asthma symptoms and no specific form of exercise is more beneficial. For some, exercise may trigger asthma symptoms and therefore it is recommended that inhalers be used beforehand. Pulmonary rehabilitation may be used to increase tolerance to exercise. Obesity can cause asthma symptoms to be harder to control or cause more severe symptoms, weight loss in obese individuals is therefore recommended.

There is not enough evidence that dietary changes, including restrictive diets or supplements are helpful in managing asthma. Alternative treatments such as acupuncture, air ionizers, manual therapies (osteopathic, chiropractic, physiotherapeutic and respiratory therapeutic manoeuvres), and breathing exercises are not recommended by clinical guidelines due to a lack of evidence that they are effective. Breathing exercises do not decrease asthma exacerbations or improve lung functioning, however they can be used alongside medications to help control symptoms.

=== Medications ===
Delivery methods
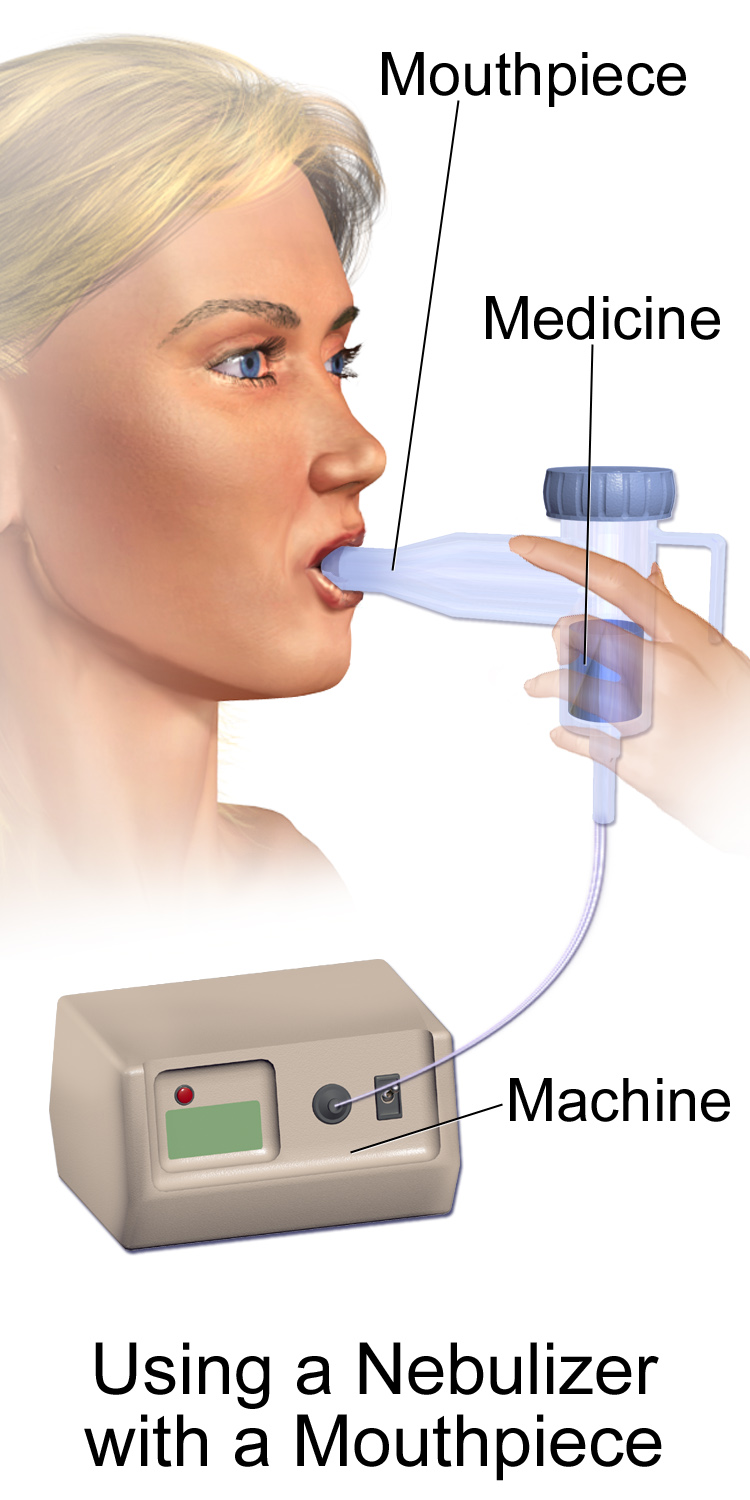
Nebulizer

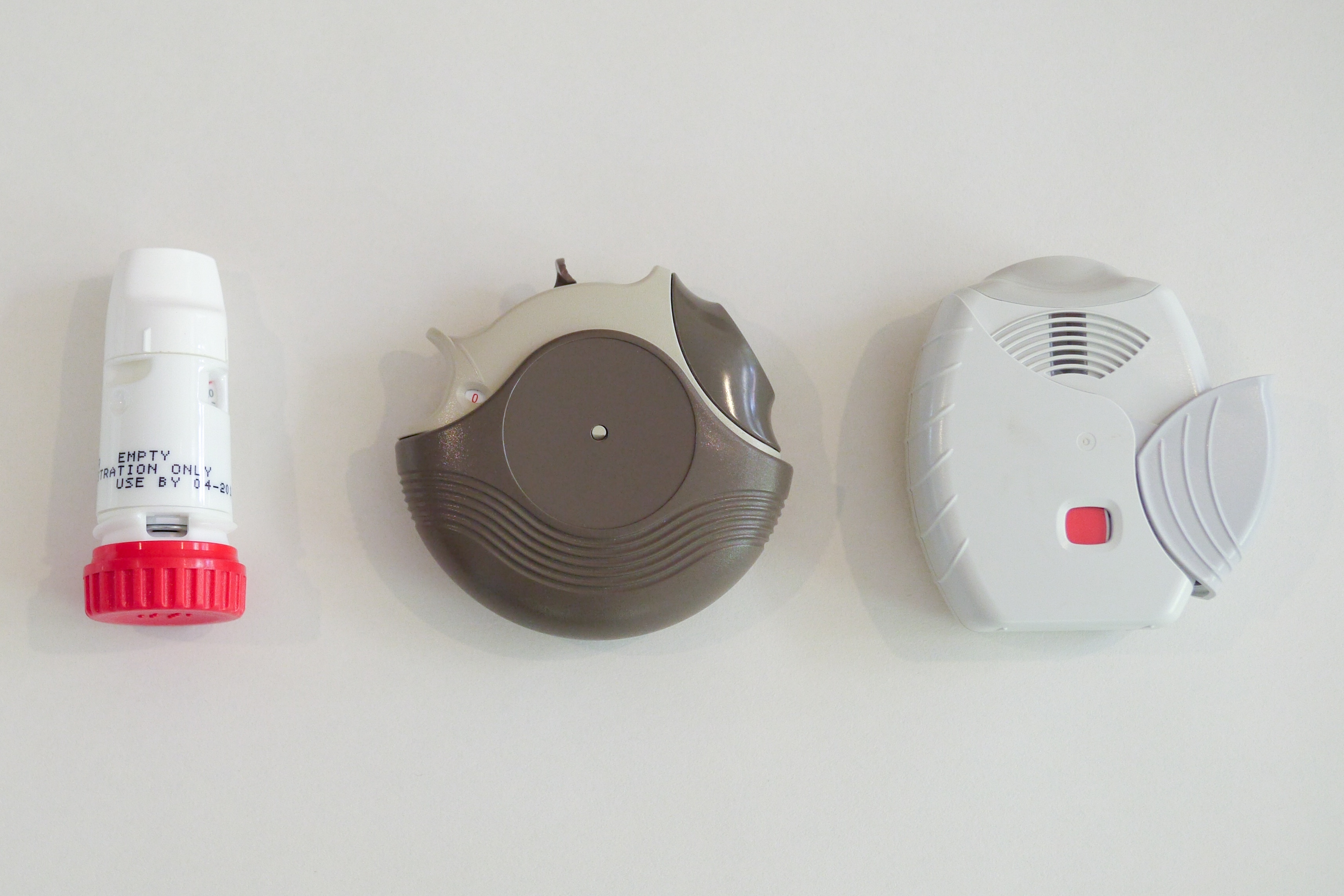
Dry powder inhalers (from left to right: Turbuhaler, Accuhaler and Ellipta devices)

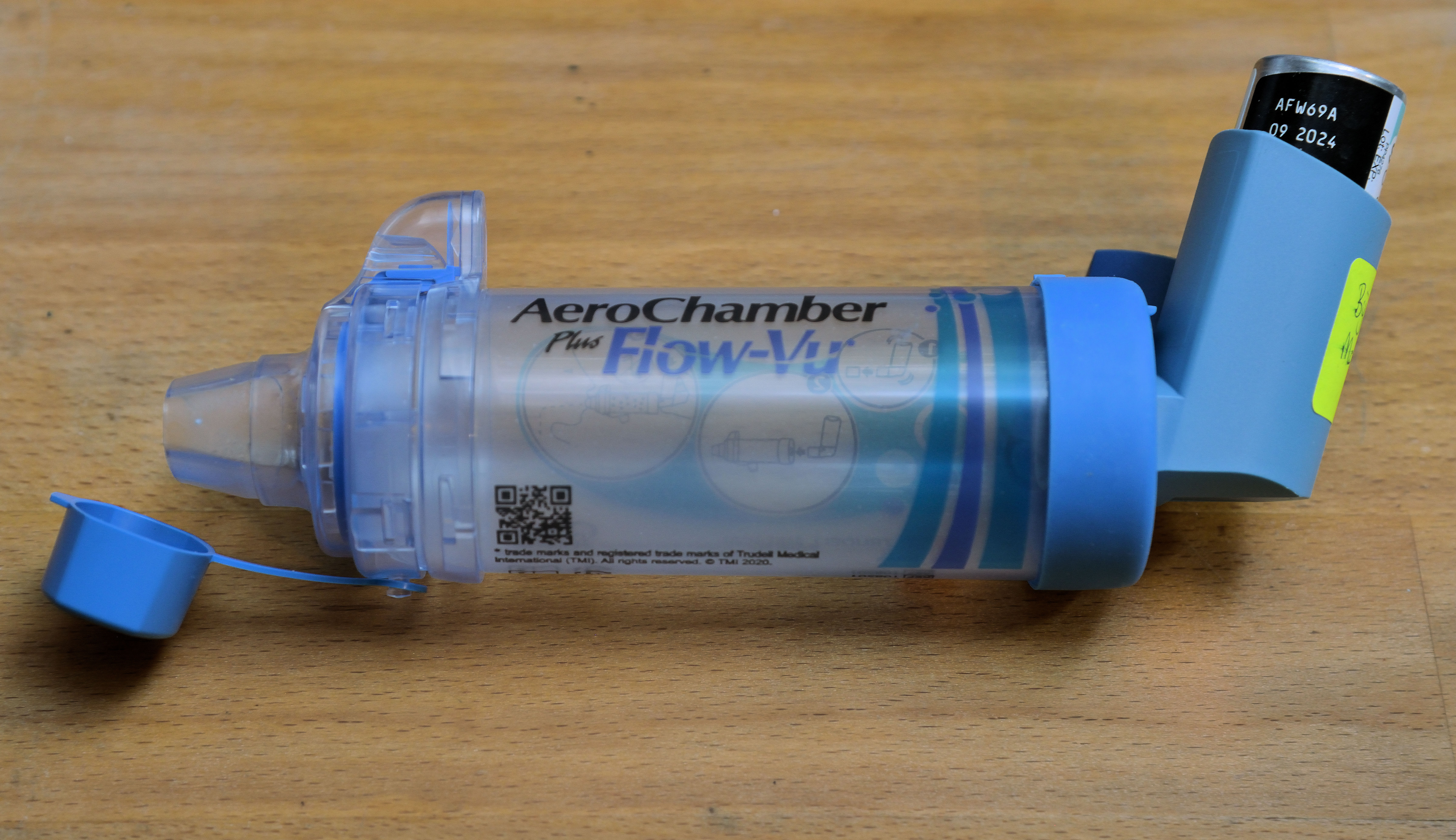
A pressurized metered dose inhaler attached to a spacer

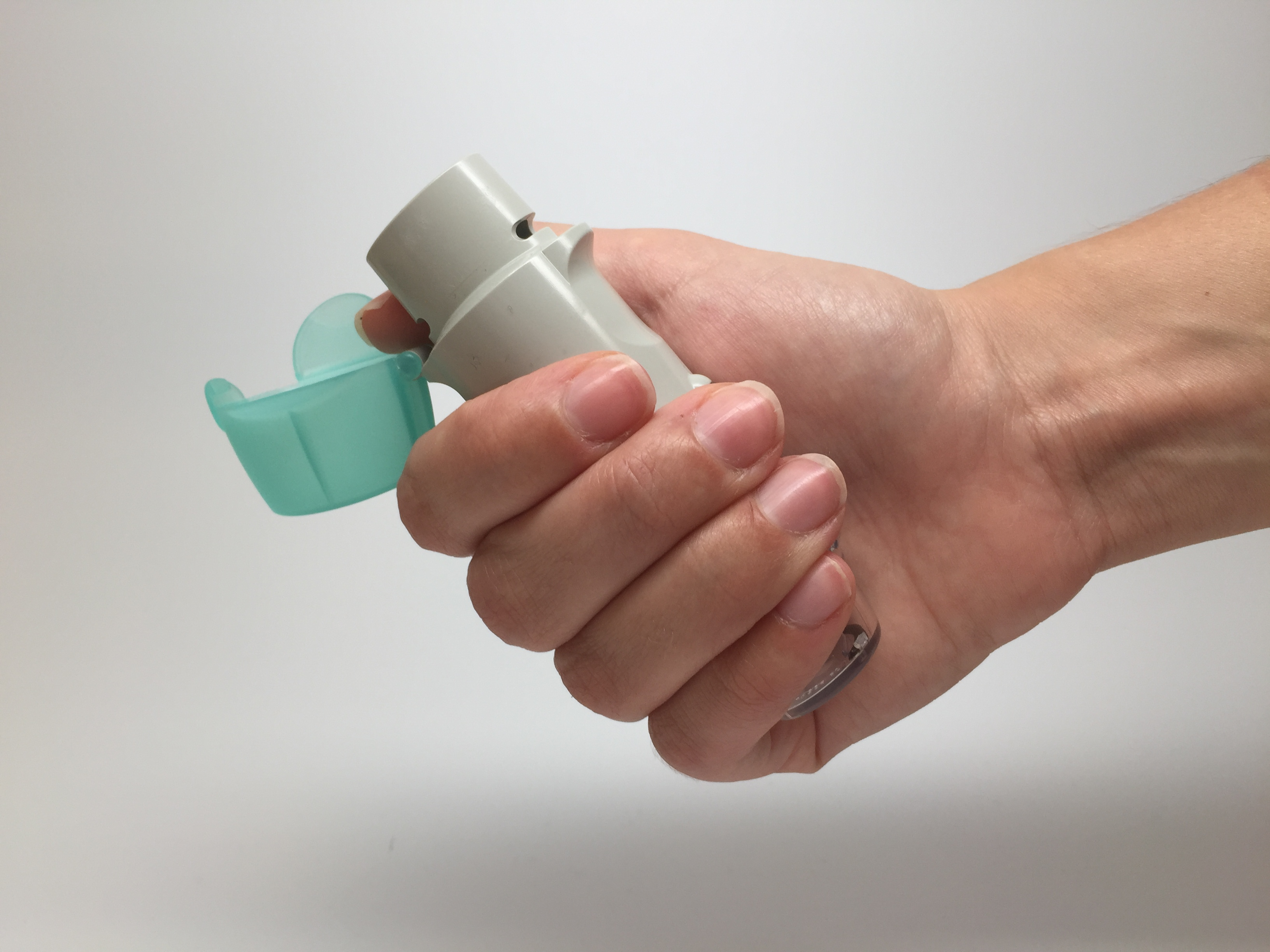
A mist inhaler

Medications for asthma are generally divided into three categories, controllers—taken daily to control symptoms, reduce exacerbations and decrease inflammation—relievers—taken as needed for severe symptoms or exacerbations—and additional medications added on to manage more severe asthma. Medications are prescribed at the lowest dose possible while still treating symptoms and preventing exacerbations.

Devices for inhaled medications include pressurized metered dose inhaler (pMDI), dry-powder inhalers (DPI), mist inhalers and nebulizers. The choice of delivery method depends on the type of medication used, local availability, age, and ability to use the inhaler properly. DPIs are difficult for children to use and are therefore discouraged in those under six years of age. Spacers are used alongside pMDIs to increase the amount of medication inhaled.

The choice of medication used for asthma management depends on symptom control, risk factors, availability, adherence, ability to use the medication, cost and environmental impact. It typically takes one or two weeks for symptoms to improve after starting inhaled corticosteroids (ICS) and the response to medication is monitored whenever it is adjusted. If asthma symptoms and exacerbations remain well controlled after two or three months, the dosage of medication can be gradually reduced to achieve symptom control at the lowest possible dose of medication. If asthma symptoms and exacerbations persist despite two to three months of treatment with ICS factors such as inhaler technique, adherence, exposure to triggers, comorbidities, and alternative diagnoses are assessed before medication dosage is increased.

The first line treatment of asthma for children are ICS, for teenagers and adults guidelines recommend a combined ICS and long-acting beta_{2} agonist (LABA) inhaler. After a diagnosis of asthma is confirmed, ICS are started as soon as possible. Guidelines also recommend that everyone diagnosed with asthma have access to a reliever inhaler in case of symptom flare ups. In children younger than five, higher doses of ICS are used to treat persistent symptoms while older individuals may be treated with an additional medication. Medical guidelines recommend referring people who have persistent symptoms despite adequate treatment to an asthma specialist (usually a respirologist or allergist).

Historically, asthma was treated with short-acting β2 agonists (SABA) as needed and ICS were only used if symptoms persisted. Due to research suggesting that management with SABA over ICS was insufficient to prevent exacerbation, updated guidelines prefer ICS over SABA.

For those over the age of twelve, if asthma is not well controlled with an ICS/formoterol inhaler then guidelines recommend that medications be taken daily instead of on an as needed basis and gradually increased until symptoms are controlled. If higher doses of ICS/formoterol are not enough to control symptoms then there are several different medications that may be added in to help manage asthma. These include the leukotriene receptor antagonists (LTRA) montelukast, a mist inhaler containing the LAMA tiotropium, and azithromycin. In those with sensitization to aeroallergens, allergen-specific immunotherapy can increase tolerance to allergens by slowly introducing the allergen to an affected person. This is done through two different methods; subcutaneous immunotherapy—injections—and sublingual immunotherapy—under the tongue. Biologics can be used to reduce inflammation that may play a role in asthma symptoms. Finally, oral corticosteroids or bronchial thermoplasty may be used as last resorts for severe asthma.

In children under the age of five who have comorbid atopic disorders and intermittent asthma symptoms or severe flare-ups an 8–12 week trial of low dose ICS as maintenance treatment and a SABA for flare-ups is recommended by NICE guidelines. If symptoms clear up during the trial then medication can be stopped and symptoms are monitored in the following months to watch for returning symptoms or exacerbation, in which case ICS and SABA can be started again. Persistent symptoms are treated with increasing doses of ICS and an LTRA.

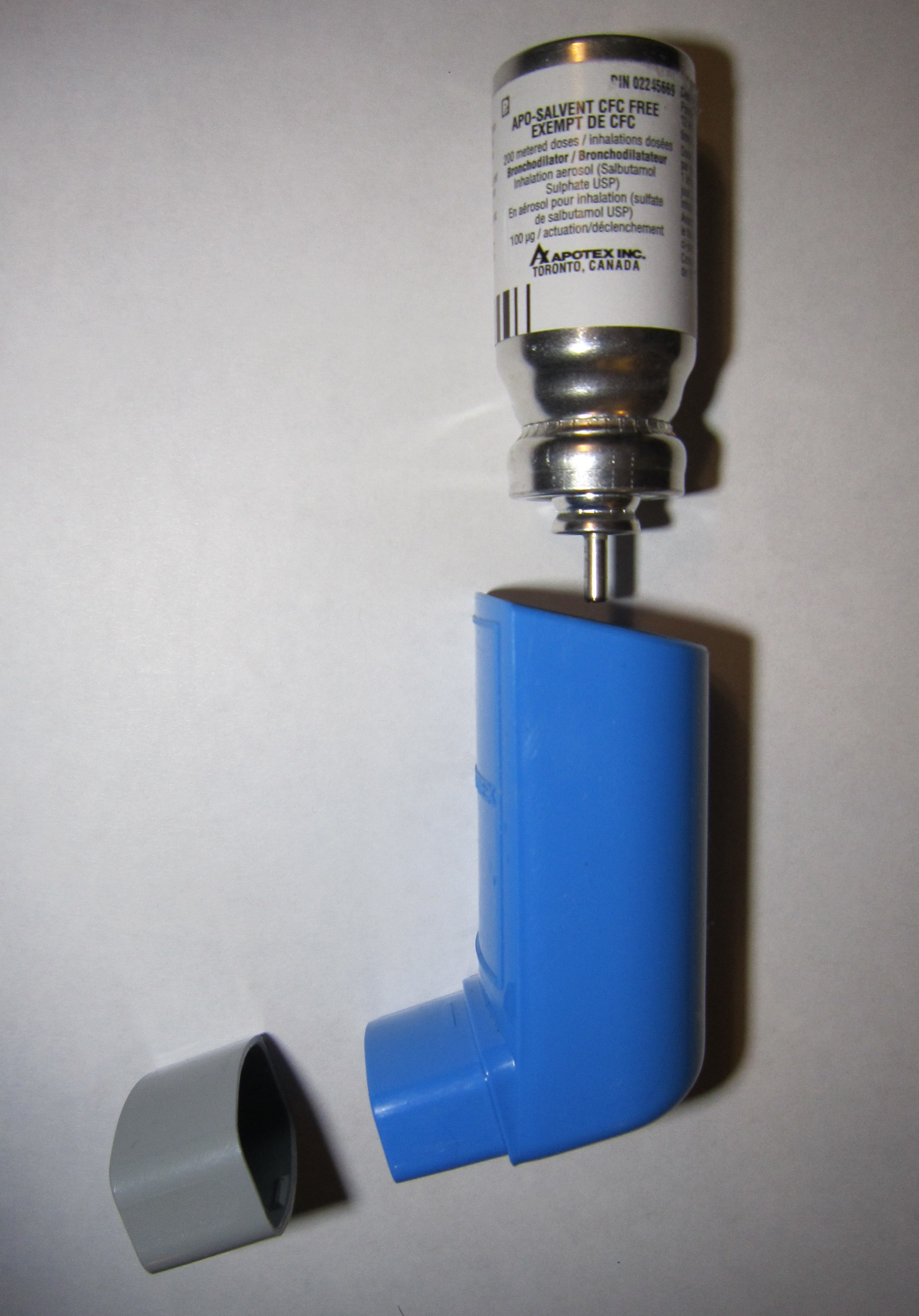
Salbutamol metered dose inhaler commonly used to treat asthma attacks

Low doses of ICS for maintenance and SABA as needed are used to manage asthma in children ages six to eleven, with ICS used whenever SABA are needed to treat flare-ups. If symptoms persist then the dose of ICS may be gradually increased, a LTRA can be added on top of inhalers or a low-dose ICS-LABA or ICS-formoterol can be used instead of ICS.

Treatment of asthma exacerbations involves several doses of bronchodilators, oral corticosteroids, and oxygen supplementation. Salbutamol (albuterol) is commonly used for treating exacerbations with several doses being administered every couple of hours until symptoms lessen. When exacerbations are severe or do not subside with inhaled medications, oral corticosteroids are used and continued for a week after the exacerbation. Oxygen therapy is also used to maintain a healthy oxygen saturation. Ipratropium, a short-acting anticholinergic, can also be used alongside other treatments to manage exacerbations in those experiencing moderate or severe symptoms. Both intravenous magnesium sulfate and helium–oxygen therapy are not recommended by clinical guidelines for the management of exacerbations, however they may be used in those whose symptoms do not react to other first-line treatment options.

=== Adherence to treatment ===
Staying with a treatment approach for preventing asthma exacerbations can be challenging, especially if the person is required to take medicine or treatments daily. Reasons for low adherence range from a conscious decision to not follow the suggested medical treatment regime for various reasons including avoiding potential side effects, misinformation, or other beliefs about the medication. Problems accessing the treatment and problems administering the treatment effectively can also result in lower adherence. Various approaches have been undertaken to try and improve adherence to treatments to help people prevent serious asthma exacerbations, including digital interventions.

== Outlook ==
Asthma symptoms usually manifest during early childhood. Young children commonly experience asthma symptoms following viral infections, however only around half go on to develop asthma. Children who experience recurring asthma symptoms are more likely to develop airway inflammation and structural changes in the lungs. They may also have reduced lung function and are more likely to continue experiencing troublesome respiratory symptoms as they enter adulthood. Despite asthma being more prevalent in children, mortality rates, morbidity, and usage of healthcare is higher amongst adults.

Over time, the mortality rate of asthma has gone down and it is now considered a rare cause of death. Estimates from The Global Burden of Disease Study (GBD) collaboration state that over one thousand people die each day due to asthma. Asthma mortality rates are typically higher in low-income regions due to lack of access to medical care.

The burden of disease is a measure of the overall impact of a disease on health. GBD estimates this impact using data on disease prevalence, deaths, and health surveys. It measures disease burden through years of life lost due to premature death (YLL) and years lived with disability (YLD). These two measures are combined to calculate disability-adjusted life years (DALYs), which represent the total health loss caused by a disease. YLD reflects both the severity of disability and how long it lasts. In 2019, asthma was responsible for an estimated 21.6 million DALYs worldwide across all age groups. It was the 34th leading cause of disease burden globally and accounted for about one-fifth of all DALYs related to chronic respiratory diseases. Nearly half of this burden was due to 10.2 million years lived with disability. Asthma was also the 24th leading cause of disability worldwide in 2019, with a slightly greater impact on males than females.

== Epidemiology ==
Asthma prevalence

In 2023, approximately 363 million people worldwide were affected by asthma, and 442,000 people died from the disease. Rates vary widely between countries, with prevalences between 1 and 29%. It is more common in developed than developing countries. Within developed countries, it is more common in those who are economically disadvantaged, while in contrast, in developing countries, it is more common in the affluent. Disparities in the prevalence of asthma reflect differences in both socioeconomic status and physical environment. People are affected by complex interactions between race, place, poverty, and health access. Urbanization and exposure to air pollution, unhygienic living conditions, and lack of resources for diagnosis and treatment may all contribute to frequency and severity of asthma symptoms in low-resource communities. Low- and middle-income countries make up more than 80% of worldwide mortality.

Populations of children and adults differ in incidence, risk factors, preventative measures, pathogenesis, treatment and prognosis of asthma. Patterns of asthma also differ according to gender in both children and adults. Prior to puberty, asthma is more common in boys than in girls. As puberty progresses, asthma symptoms increase in girls. By adulthood, both prevalence and severity of asthma are greater in populations of women compared to men. Utilisation of health services, morbidity and mortality are all higher in adults than in children.

== History ==
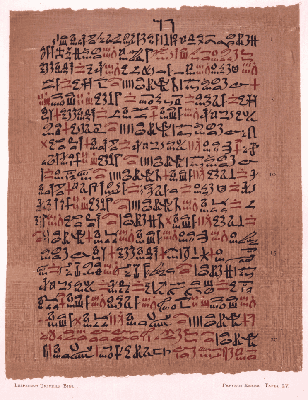
The Egyptian Ebers Papyrus (c.1550 BC), detailing a treatment for asthma

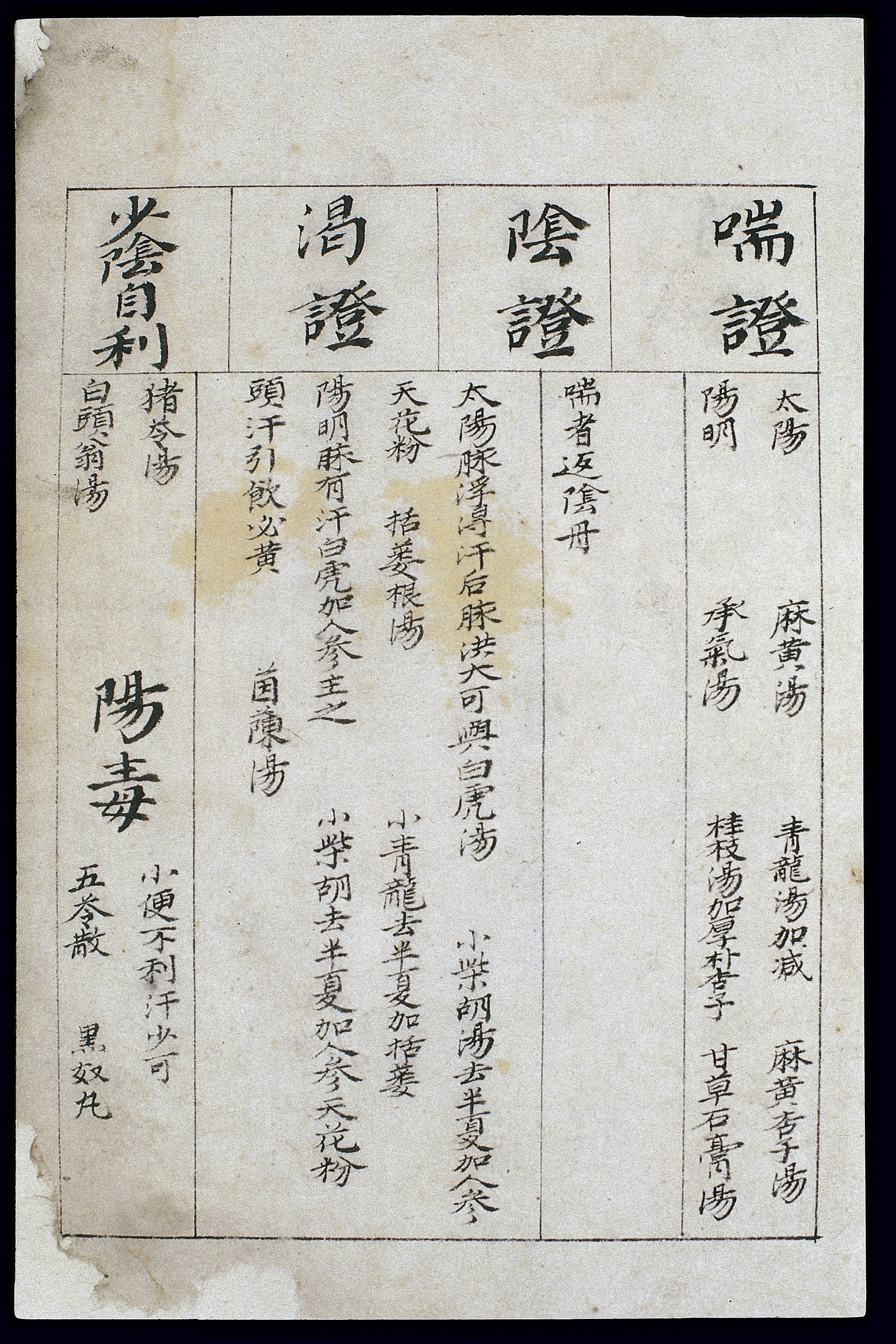
The Chinese Gold-dust Book of Cold Damage, dated the "1st year of the Zhengyuan reign period of the Yuan dynasty" (1341)

Asthma was recognized in ancient Egypt and was treated by drinking an incense mixture known as kyphi. It was officially named as a specific respiratory problem by Hippocrates c. 450 BC, with the Greek word for 'panting' (ἆσθμα) forming the basis of the modern name asthma. In 200 BC, it was believed to be at least partly related to the emotions. In the 12th century, the Jewish physician and philosopher Maimonides wrote Maqāla fī al-Rabw ("Treatise on Asthma") in Arabic. In the work, he described the symptoms of asthma, proposed dietary and therapeutic treatments, and emphasized the importance of clean air and climate in managing the condition. Traditional Chinese medicine also offered medication for asthma, as indicated by a surviving 14th-century manuscript curated by the Wellcome Foundation.

=== 19th century ===
A well-documented case of asthma in the 19th century was that of the young Theodore Roosevelt (1858–1919). At the time, there was no effective treatment for asthma; Roosevelt's youth was in large part shaped by his poor health, which was partly related to the condition. He experienced recurring nighttime asthma attacks that felt as if he was being smothered to death, terrifying the boy and his parents.

In 1873, one of the first papers in modern medicine on the subject tried to explain the pathophysiology of the disease while another in 1872, concluded that asthma can be cured by rubbing the chest with chloroform liniment. Medical treatment in 1880 included the use of intravenous doses of a drug called pilocarpine. In 1886, F. H. Bosworth theorized a connection between asthma and hay fever.

=== 20th century ===
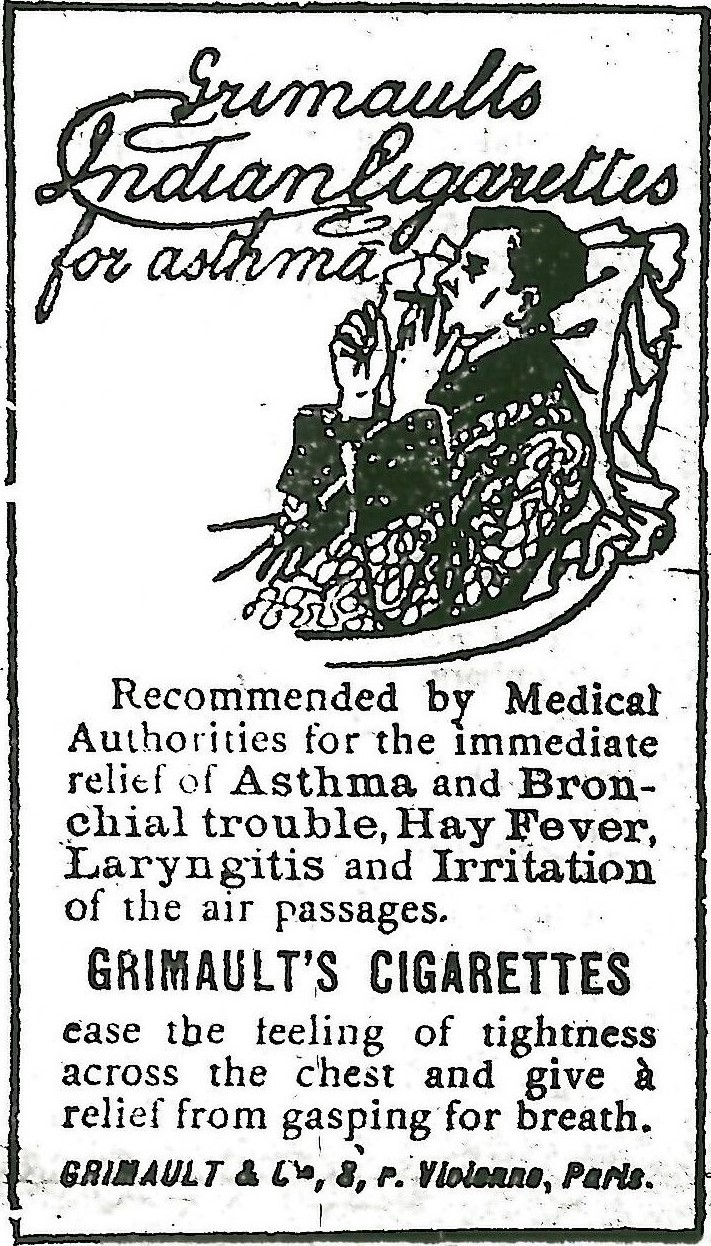
1907 advertisement for Grimault's Indian Cigarettes, promoted as a means of relieving asthma. They contained belladonna and cannabis.

At the beginning of the 20th century, treatment was focused on avoidance of allergens and the use of selective beta_{2}-adrenergic agonists as treatment strategies.

Epinephrine (adrenaline) was first referred to as a treatment of asthma in 1905. The asthma was relieved with this treatment by what was described as "vasomotor ataxia of the relaxing variety". The successful results of using epinephrine provided encouraging medical data on the hypothesis that asthma was due to vasodilation and the subsequent inflammation of the swelling of the bronchial mucosa.

In the 1930s, U.S. physician Alvan Barach created, by means of spirometry, the quantification of expiratory flow rates to nebulized epinephrine for those with asthma, which was the first published medical report on the effectiveness of bronchodilation.

During the 1930s to 1950s, asthma was known as one of the "holy seven" psychosomatic illnesses. Its cause was considered to be psychological, with treatment often based on psychoanalysis and other talking cures. As these psychoanalysts interpreted the asthmatic wheeze as the suppressed cry of the child for its mother, they considered the treatment of depression to be especially important for individuals with asthma.

In the 1940s, the first pure β-agonist to be synthesized was isoprenaline. Both isoprenaline and adrenaline are catecholamines. However, isoprenaline was an effective bronchodilator that was more selective than epinephrine. The efficacy of anecdotal applications of oral corticosteroids (OCS) for the asthma was published in 1952. In 1958, the association between a treatment strategy of OCS and a reduction in eosinophils in the sputum was published.

The use of a pressurized metered dose inhaler was developed in the mid-1950s for the administration of adrenaline as well as isoproterenol, and was later used as a beta_{2}-adrenergic agonist. Inhaled corticosteroids and selective short-acting beta agonists came into wide use in the 1960s. In 1967, adrenergic receptors were classified into the two subtypes of the β_{1} and the β_{2} adrenergic receptors. The β_{2} adrenergic receptors were found to be dominant in the lungs as well as present in the alveolar airspace. The discovery of the β_{2} adrenergic receptors allowed for the discovery and development of beta2 agonists. Specifically, it allowed for the development of selective β_{2}-agonists starting in the 1960s.

==== Global mortality rates ====
Between 1970 and 1985, the following countries saw a general rise in reported asthma mortality in people aged 5 to 34: Singapore, Australia, Japan, England/Wales, West Germany, Israel, United States, Netherlands, Canada, and France. Additionally, New Zealand experienced a major epidemic of asthma in this period, which may have been due to inadequate maintenance therapy and long-term management of the disease amongst those affected, as well as delays in receiving care in emergencies.

== Society and culture ==
=== Health disparities ===
As of 2005, more "westernized," urbanized countries had much higher rates of asthma than "less developed" countries. However, exposure to urbanization alone has not been able to explain these disparities.

In the United States, the burden of asthma falls disproportionately on racial and ethnic minorities and economically underprivileged populations. As of 2016, the prevalence of asthma was highest in non-Hispanic black and Puerto Rican children. The prevalence of asthma was also over 1.5 times higher in Americans 100% below the poverty level than those 450% of the poverty level or higher. As of 2021, the mortality rate for black Americans with asthma was two times higher than for white Americans.

Neighborhoods in the United States with predominantly racial and ethnic minority populations are affected to a greater extent than predominantly white neighborhoods by air pollutants, which are a significant factor in the occurrence of asthma. Additionally, residents of areas that were more likely to be redlined have asthma emergency department visit rates 2.4 times higher than residents of areas that were less likely to be redlined.

=== Economics ===
People with asthma often experience reduced quality of life, including fatigue, sleep problems, lower levels of physical activity, and difficulty concentrating. These problems can lead to missed days at school or work and can create financial and productivity challenges for families and communities. Asthma also places a major economic burden on society. In 2008, the estimated costs of asthma were between $49.36 million and $8,256 million in several high-income countries, including Canada, Germany, Singapore, Switzerland, and the United States. A later study found that the total annual cost of asthma in the United States had risen to $81.9 billion by 2013.

There is less information available from low- and middle-income countries. However, the financial impact is greatest among people with severe or poorly controlled asthma. In developing countries, people with uncontrolled asthma account for about half of all asthma-related costs, despite making up only 10–20% of people with the disease. Worldwide, the financial burden of asthma is estimated to be greater than that of tuberculosis and HIV/AIDS combined.
