= Brittle asthma =

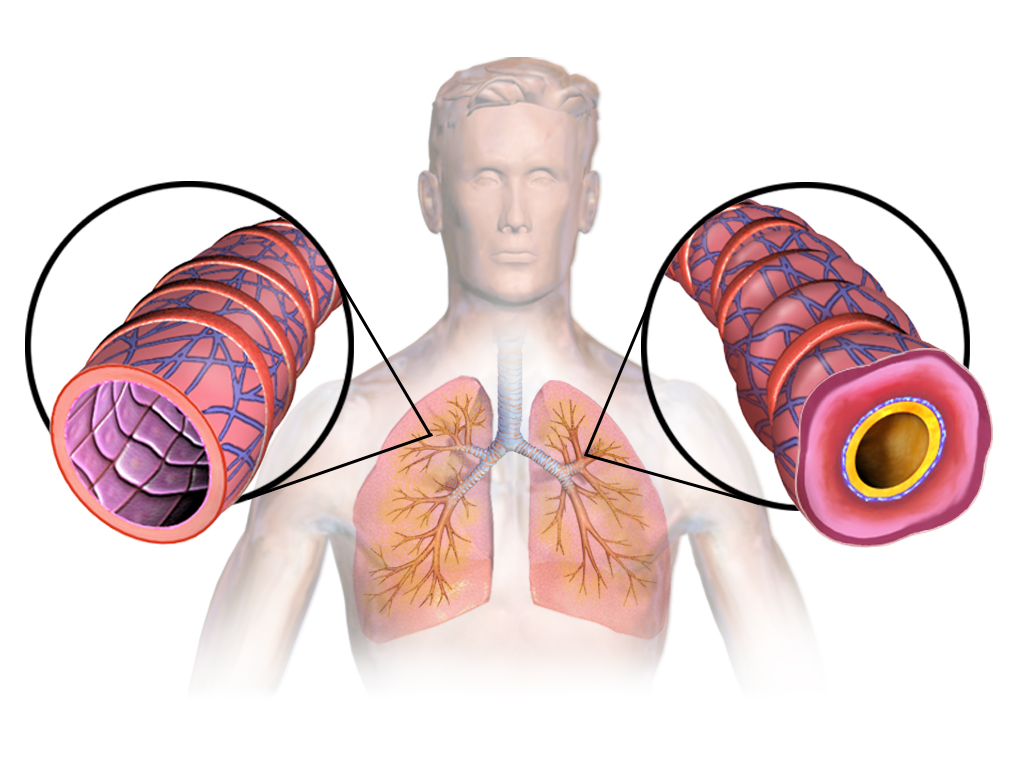
- Asthma (lungs)
- Prevention: Allergen avoidance and self-management approach

Brittle asthma is a type of asthma distinguishable from other forms by recurrent, severe attacks. There are two subtypes divided by symptoms: Type 1 and Type 2, depending on the stability of the patient's maximum speed of expiration, or peak expiratory flow rate (PEFR). Type 1 is characterized by a maintained wide PEF variability despite considerable medical therapy including a dose of inhaled steroids, and Type 2 is characterized by sudden acute attacks occurring in less than three hours without an obvious trigger on a background of well controlled asthma.

Brittle asthma is one of the "unstable" subtypes of "difficult asthma", a term used to characterize the less than 5% of asthma cases that do not respond to maximal inhaled treatment, including high doses of corticosteroids combined with additional therapies such as long-acting beta-2 agonists.

== Diagnosis ==
=== Types ===
The 2005 Oxford Textbook of Medicine distinguishes type 1 brittle asthma by "persistent daily chaotic variability in peak flow (usually greater than 40 per cent diurnal variation in PEFR more than 50 per cent of the time)", while type 2 is identified by "sporadic sudden falls in PEFR against a background of usually well-controlled asthma with normal or near normal lung function". In both types, patients are subject to recurrent, severe attacks. The cardinal symptoms of an asthma attack are shortness of breath (dyspnea), wheezing, and chest tightness. Individuals with type 1 suffer chronic attacks in spite of ongoing medical therapy, while those with type 2 experience sudden, acute and even potentially life-threatening attacks even though otherwise their asthma seems well managed.

When first defined by Margaret Turner-Warwick in 1977, the term brittle asthma was used specifically to describe type 1, but as studies into the phenotype were conducted the second type was also distinguished.

== Treatment ==
In addition to any issues of treatment compliance, and maximised corticosteroids (inhaled or oral) and beta agonist, brittle asthma treatment also involves for type 1 additional subcutaneous injections of beta2 agonist and inhalation of long acting beta-adrenoceptor agonist, whilst type 2 needs allergen avoidance and self-management approaches. Since catastrophic attacks are unpredictable in type 2, patients may display identification of the issue, such as a MedicAlert bracelet, and carry an epinephrine autoinjector.

== Epidemiology ==
The condition is rare. 1999's Difficult Asthma estimates a prevalence of approximately 0.05% brittle asthma sufferers among the asthmatic population. Though found in all ages, it is most commonly found in individuals between the ages of 18 and 55; it is present in both sexes, though type 1 has been diagnosed in three times as many women as men. Hospitalization is more frequent for type 1 than type 2.
