= Childhood asthma =

Childhood asthma is a chronic respiratory condition characterized by inflammation and narrowing of the airways, leading to recurrent episodes of wheezing, shortness of breath, chest tightness and coughing. Around 4.9 million children in the US have asthma. It is difficult to diagnose asthma in children younger than 6 years of age. There can be multiple factors that can contribute to asthma in childhood such as genetics, allergens, and viral infections. Children are particularly vulnerable to environmental factors that contribute to asthma due to their developing respiratory systems, higher respiratory rates, and increased exposure to outdoor air pollutants during play and school activities. Childhood asthma has been linked to various environmental exposures such as air pollution, allergens, and indoor toxins. Additionally, social determinants such as housing quality, access to healthcare, and socioeconomic status can influence prevalence and outcomes.

Asthma attacks are triggered by infections, dust, psychological and physical stress, or excessive exercise. These exacerbations may require medical intervention or hospitalization. Early diagnosis, preventative measures and effective asthma management strategies can significantly improve a child's well-being and reduce the frequency of attacks. Ongoing public health efforts focus on reducing childhood asthma prevalence through education, improved air quality regulations, environmental control strategies, and expanded access to healthcare.

== Indoor allergens as a risk factor ==
Asthma exacerbations in children have been associated with exposure to residential indoor environmental stressors such as allergens and air pollutants. Common indoor allergens that contribute to asthma symptoms include dust mites, mold, cockroach droppings, pet dander, and rodent allergens. Dust mites found in bedding, carpets, and upholstery are the most common indoor asthma trigger. Proteins found in cockroach saliva, feces and body parts are also a potent asthma trigger. Studies indicate that sensitization and exposure to cockroach have been associated with increased hospitalizations and asthma related emergencies.

Additionally, tobacco smoke and secondhand exposure increases the likelihood of childhood asthma development and can worsen symptoms. Secondhand smoke contains chemicals including benzene, formaldehyde and carbon monoxide which trigger airway inflammation in children with asthma. Secondhand smoke has been found to be linked to increase in school absence, emergency care, and hospitalization among children with asthma

== Prevention ==
Preventing childhood asthma exacerbations requires a multifaceted approach that includes reducing exposure to environmental triggers, implementing public health policies, and ensuring proper asthma management. One effective strategy is minimizing exposure to common indoor allergens by maintaining clean and well-ventilated living environments.Regular cleaning and washing of bedding to minimize dust mite exposure, as well as, using HEPA filters in vacuum cleaners and air purifiers. Additionally, eliminating exposure to tobacco smoke and secondhand smoke is critical, as studies have shown that decreased exposure has led to decreased asthma related hospitalizations and improved lung function. Additional steps to take in lowering children's risk are keeping homes free of mold and dampness. Mold is a known risk of childhood asthma as stated above in the article.

Uncontrolled asthma can interfere with daily activities and limit physical activity. Some warning signs are frequent nighttime coughing with waking up a few times a month, coughing during exercise, increased usage of inhaler, or prolonged coughing.
