= Guardian Service Processor =

The Guardian Service Processor (also referred as GSP) is a hardware subsystem within several models of server computers made by HP.

It is a separate computer system within the server that allows some service tasks. It is available as long as the system is supplied with power, even when the main operating system (usually HP-UX) is shut down, defective or not installed at all.

Common tasks of the GSP are:

- Alert display configuration
- Automatic System Restart configuration
- Remote Power Control (if the system is managed from remote)
- Configure asynchronous/serial ports
- Display of several status values
- Reset system ("reboot")
- Show logs (chassis code buffer)
- System status of proc. modules
- LAN configuration for console port
- Firmware upgrades
