= Guatemala Stove Project =

Canada-based charity

The Guatemala Stove Project (GSP) is a registered Canadian charity (#871977617 RR0001) that raises funds and provides volunteers for the building of masonry cookstoves in Guatemala's Altiplano (Western Highlands).

The Guatemala Stove Project works in partnership with CEDEC (Centro De Estudios Para El Desarrollo Y La Cooperacion), a non profit indigenous group from Quetzaltenango (Xela) Guatemala. CEDEC and the Guatemala Stove Project work with local women's groups to identify the families who are in need of a stove.

Since 1999 the Guatemala Stove Project has built over 7000 stoves.

== See also ==
- Indoor air pollution in developing nations
- Appropriate technology
