= General Samaj Party =

Political party in Punjab, India

General Samaj Party is a political party in the Indian state of Punjab. GSP was founded in 2002. GSP opposes affirmative action quotas.

The general secretary of the party is T.N. Sharma. The Punjab state general secretary is Rajbir Singh Sidhu. The president of the party is Suresh Kumar Goyal. The convenor of the Yuva Morcha (Youth Front) of the party is Bhupinder Bansal.

In March 2003 GSP won one of 21 seats in the Gurdaspur Municipal Corporation.
