= Idiopathic pulmonary fibrosis =

Fibrosis of lungs due to unknown causes

- Other names: Fibrosing alveolitis, cryptogenic fibrosing alveolitis, diffuse fibrosing alveolitis, usual interstitial pneumonitis, diffuse interstitial pneumonitis
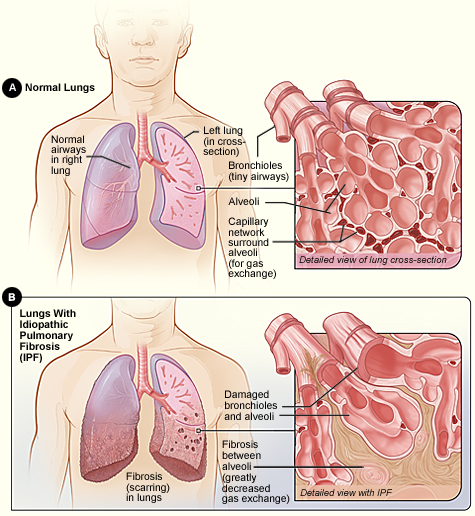
- Figure A shows the location of the lungs and airways in the body. The inset image shows a detailed view of the lung's airways and air sacs in cross-section. Figure B shows fibrosis (scarring) in the lungs. The inset image shows a detailed view of the fibrosis and how it damages the airways and air sacs.
- Specialty: Pulmonology
- Symptoms: Shortness of breath, dry coughing
- Complications: Pulmonary hypertension, heart failure, pneumonia, pulmonary embolism
- Usual onset: Gradual
- Causes: Unknown
- Risk factors: Cigarette smoking, certain viral infections, family history
- Diagnostic method: CT scan, lung biopsy
- Differential diagnosis: Sarcoidosis, other interstitial lung diseases, hypersensitivity pneumonitis
- Treatment: Pulmonary rehabilitation, supplemental oxygen, lung transplantation
- Medication: Pirfenidone, nintedanib
- Prognosis: Life expectancy ~ 4 years
- Frequency: 12 per 100,000 people per year

Idiopathic pulmonary fibrosis (IPF), previously called cryptogenic fibrosing alveolitis, is a rare, progressive illness of the respiratory system. It is characterized by the thickening and stiffening of the lung tissue that surrounds the air sacs, and is associated with the formation of scar tissue. It is a type of chronic pulmonary fibrosis characterized by a progressive and irreversible decline in lung function.

Symptoms typically include gradual onset of shortness of breath and a dry cough. Other symptoms may include feeling tired, and digit clubbing (abnormally enlarged, dome-shaped fingers and toenails). Complications may include pulmonary hypertension, heart failure, pneumonia or pulmonary embolism.

The cause is unknown, hence the term idiopathic. Risk factors include cigarette smoking, gastroesophageal reflux disease, certain viral infections, and a genetic predisposition. The underlying mechanism involves scarring of the lungs. As it is such a severe disease, a full differential diagnosis is necessary, ruling out other potential causes. It may be supported by a high resolution CT scan or lung biopsy which show usual interstitial pneumonia. It is a type of interstitial lung disease.

People often benefit from pulmonary rehabilitation and supplemental oxygen. Anti-fibrotic medications like pirfenidone or nintedanib may slow the progression of the disease. Lung transplantation may also be an option.

About 5 million people are affected globally. The disease newly occurs in about 12 of every 100,000 people per year, with those in their 60s and 70s most commonly affected, and males more commonly affected than females. Average life expectancy following diagnosis is about four years.

Updated international guidelines were published in 2022, which resulted in some simplification in the disease's diagnosis, and the removal of antacids as a possible adjunct therapy.

== Signs and symptoms ==
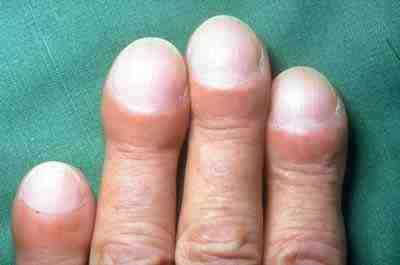
Clubbing of the fingers in idiopathic pulmonary fibrosis

Lung sound in IPF
velcro crackles on auscultation in a person with IPF

In many people, symptoms are present for a considerable time before diagnosis. The most common clinical features of IPF include the following:

- Age over 50 years
- Dry, non-productive cough on exertion
- Progressive exertional dyspnea (shortness of breath with exercise)
- Dry, inspiratory bilateral basal crackles on auscultation (a crackling or popping sound in the lungs during inhalation).
- Clubbing of the digits, a disfigurement of the finger tips or toes (see image)
- Abnormal pulmonary function test results, with evidence of restriction and impaired gas exchange.

Some of these features are due to chronic hypoxemia (oxygen deficiency in the blood), and are not specific for IPF, they can occur in other pulmonary disorders. IPF should be considered in all patients with unexplained chronic exertional dyspnea who present with cough, inspiratory bilateral basal crackles, or finger clubbing.

Assessment of crackles on lung auscultation is a practical way to improve the earlier diagnosis of IPF. Fine crackles, also known as "velcro" crackles are easily recognized by clinicians and are characteristic of IPF.

If bilateral fine crackles are present throughout the inspiratory time and are persisting after several deep breaths, and if remaining present on several occasions several weeks apart in a subject aged ≥60 years, this should raise the suspicion of IPF and lead to consideration of an HRCT scan of the chest which is more sensitive than a chest X-ray. As crackles are not specific for IPF, they must prompt a thorough diagnostic process.

== Causes ==
Despite extensive investigation, the cause of IPF remains unknown. The fibrosis in IPF has been linked to cigarette smoking, environmental factors (e.g. occupational exposure to gases, smoke, chemicals or dusts), other medical conditions including gastroesophageal reflux disease, or to genetic predisposition (familial IPF).

Certain environmental factors and exposures have been shown to increase the risk of IPF. Cigarette smoking is the best recognized and most accepted risk factor, and increases the risk of IPF by about twofold. Other environmental and occupational exposures such as exposure to metal dust, wood dust, coal dust, silica, stone dust, biologic dusts coming from hay dust or mold spores or other agricultural products, and occupations related to farming/livestock have also been shown to increase the risk for IPF. There is some evidence that viral infections may be associated with idiopathic pulmonary fibrosis and other fibrotic lung diseases.

== Pathogenesis ==
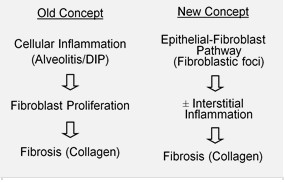

IPF is believed to be the result of an aberrant wound healing process including/involving abnormal and excessive deposition of collagen (fibrosis) in the pulmonary interstitium with minimal associated inflammation. Cellular senescence is suspected to be a central contributing cause, a belief which is supported by benefits seen in patients given senolytic therapy.

It is hypothesized that the initial or repetitive injury in IPF occurs to the lung alveolar epithelial cells (pneumocytes), the type I and type II cells, which line the majority of the alveolar surface. When type I cells are damaged or lost, it is thought that type II cells undergo proliferation to cover the exposed basement membranes. In normal repair, the hyperplastic type II cells die and the remaining cells spread and undergo a differentiation process to become type I cells. Under pathologic conditions and in the presence of transforming growth factor beta (TGF-β), fibroblasts accumulate in these areas of damage and differentiate into myofibroblasts that secrete collagen and other proteins. In the current classification of the pathogenesis of IPF, it is believed that it occurs by way of the formation of a UIP (usual interstitial pneumonia) lesion, which then undergoes the aforementioned pathological condition characteristic of IPF. Other proposed repeated injury mechanisms indicate that IPF may result not just from a UIP lesion, but also from NSIP and DAD (nonspecific interstitial pneumonia and diffuse alveolar damage) lesions, or a combination of several.

In the past, it was thought that inflammation was the first event in initiating lung tissue scarring. Later findings showed that the development of fibroblastic foci precedes the accumulation of inflammatory cells and the consequent deposition of collagen. This pathogenetic model is indirectly supported by the clinical features of IPF, including an insidious onset over several years, relatively infrequent acute exacerbations, and failure to respond to immunosuppressive therapy. However, it is the belief of some researchers that the disease is a multi-mechanistic one, wherein the trigger for the disease may stem from abnormalities in any number of wound healing pathways, including the inflammatory response. Such abnormalities could occur in any number of the nine implicated pathways (clotting cascade, antioxidant pathways, apoptosis, inflammatory cytokines, angiogenesis and vascular remodelling, growth factors, surfactant and matrix regulatory factors), and that through further investigation into all nine, novel therapies and approaches could be proposed on a unique or case-by-case basis should attempts at treating or circumventing complications in any one pathway prove unsuccessful. A number of therapies that target fibroblast activation or the synthesis of extracellular matrix are currently in early testing or are being considered for development.

Familial IPF accounts for less than 5% of the total of patients with IPF and is clinically and histologically indistinguishable from sporadic IPF. Genetic associations include mutations in pulmonary surfactant proteins A1, A2, C (SFTPA1, SFTPA2B) and mucin (MUC5B). A remarkable aspect of the MUC5B variant is its high frequency of detection, as it is found in approximately 20% of individuals with Northern and Western European ancestry and in 19% of the Framingham Heart Study population. Mutations in human telomerase genes are also associated with familial pulmonary fibrosis and in some patients with sporadic IPF (e.g. the TERT, TERC genes). Recently an X-linked mutation in a third telomerase-associated gene, dyskerin (DKC1), has been described in a family with IPF.

== Diagnosis ==
An earlier diagnosis of IPF is a prerequisite for earlier treatment and, potentially, improvement of the long-term clinical outcome of this progressive and ultimately fatal disease. If IPF is suspected, diagnosis can be challenging but a multidisciplinary approach involving a pulmonologist, radiologist and pathologist expert in interstitial lung disease has been shown to improve the accuracy of IPF diagnosis.

A Multidisciplinary Consensus Statement on the Idiopathic Interstitial Pneumonias published by the American Thoracic Society (ATS) and the European Respiratory Society (ERS) in 2000 proposed specific major and minor criteria for establishing the diagnosis of IPF. However, in 2011, new simplified and updated criteria for the diagnosis and management of IPF were published by the ATS, ERS, together with the Japanese Respiratory Society (JRS) and Latin American Thoracic Association (ALAT). Currently, a diagnosis of IPF requires:

- Exclusion of known causes of interstitial lung disease (ILD), e.g., domestic and occupational environmental exposures, connective tissue disorders, or drug exposure/toxicity
- The presence of a typical radiological pattern of usual interstitial pneumonia (UIP) on high-resolution computed tomography (HRCT).

In the right clinical setting, it is possible to make the diagnosis of IPF by HRCT alone, obviating the need for surgical lung biopsy.

Various technologies using artificial intelligence have been developed to help with diagnosis. A deep learning algorithm for categorizing high-resolution CT images reported high accuracy and a research project led by Nagoya University Graduate School of Medicine and Riken used a combination of deep learning and machine learning algorithm to accurately diagnose the disease.

Recent developments indicate a potential benefit of positron emission tomography (PET) for diagnosis of IPF if suitable radiotracers are applied. Since IPF is driven by transforming growth factor beta (TGF-β), cellular mechanisms that enhance the interstitial TGF-β concentration are also a key factor for IPF development. The likely most important activator of TGF-β is αvβ6-integrin, which releases TGF-β from its latent form. Hence, αvβ6-integrin has been recognized earlier as a potential prognostic biomarker for IPF. Radiopharmaceuticals targeting αvβ6-integrin have thus been proposed for diagnosis of IPF by means of PET/CT imaging. The tracer ^{68}Ga-Trivehexin showed an uptake of SUV_{max} = 5.53 in fibrotic lung tissue and enabled a differentiation between fibrotic and non-fibrotic lung areas in PET/CT images. ^{68}Ga-Trivehexin yielded clear PET signals in IPF lesions which were PET-negative using the standard metabolic PET tracer ^{18}F-FDG.

=== Differential diagnosis ===
Recognizing IPF in clinical practice can be challenging as symptoms often appear similar to those of more common diseases, such as asthma, chronic obstructive pulmonary disease (COPD) and congestive heart failure. The key issue facing clinicians is whether the presenting history, symptoms (or signs), radiology, and pulmonary function testing are collectively in keeping with the diagnosis of IPF or whether the findings are due to another process. It has long been recognized that patients with ILD related to asbestos exposure, drugs (such as chemotherapeutic agents or nitrofurantoin), rheumatoid arthritis and scleroderma/systemic sclerosis may be difficult to distinguish from IPF. Other differential diagnostic considerations include interstitial lung disease related to mixed connective tissue disease, advanced sarcoidosis, chronic hypersensitivity pneumonitis, pulmonary Langerhan's cell histiocytosis and radiation-induced lung injury.

=== Classification ===
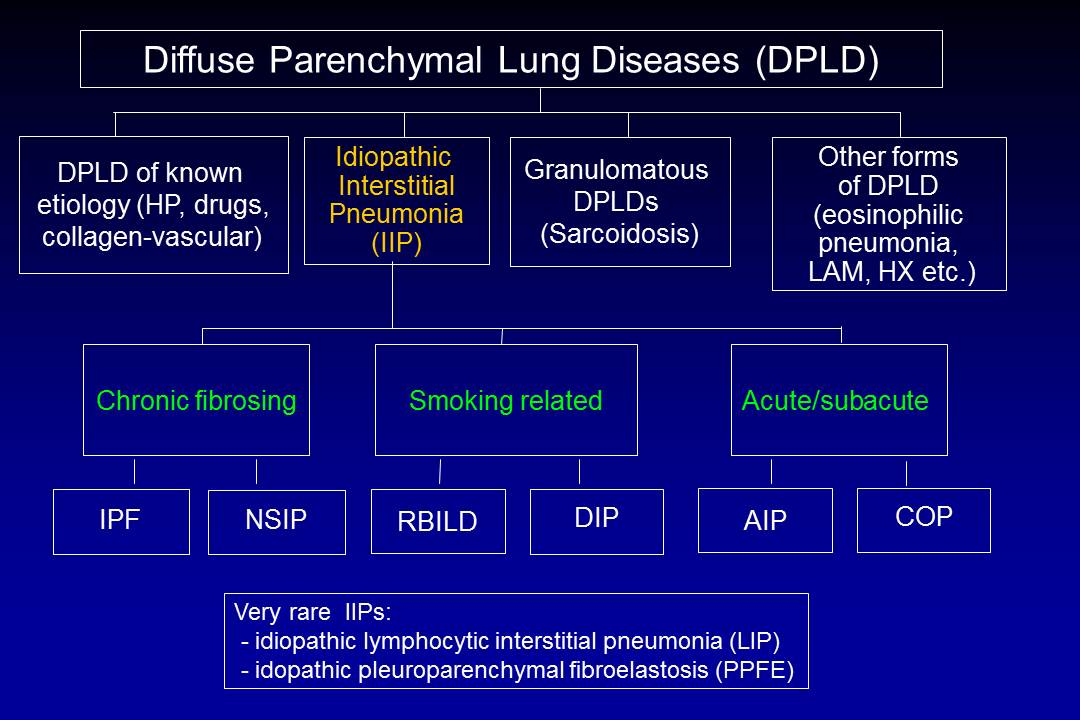
Classification of IIPs.

Idiopathic pulmonary fibrosis (IPF) belongs to a large group of more than 200 lung diseases known as interstitial lung diseases (ILDs), which are characterized by the involvement of the lung interstitium, the tissue between the air sacs of the lung. IPF is one specific presentation of idiopathic interstitial pneumonia (IIP), which is in turn a type of ILD, also known as diffuse parenchymal lung disease (DPLD).

The 2002 American Thoracic Society/European Respiratory Society (ATS/ERS) classification of IIPs was updated in 2013. In this new classification there are three main categories of idiopathic interstitial pneumonias (IIPs): major IIPs, rare IIPs, and unclassifiable IIPs. The major IIPs are grouped into chronic fibrosing IPs (this includes IPF and non-specific interstitial pneumonia [NSIP]); smoking-related IPs (i.e. respiratory bronchiolitis–interstitial lung disease [RB-ILD] and desquamative interstitial pneumonia [DIP]); and acute/subacute IPs (i.e. cryptogenic organizing pneumonia [COP] and acute interstitial pneumonia [AIP]).

The diagnosis of IIPs requires exclusion of known causes of ILD. Examples of ILD of known cause include hypersensitivity pneumonitis, pulmonary Langerhan's cell histiocytosis, asbestosis, and collagen vascular disease. However, these disorders frequently affect not only the interstitium, but also the air spaces, peripheral airways, and blood vessels.

=== Radiology ===
Chest X-rays are useful in the follow-up routine of IPF patients. Plain chest X-rays are unfortunately not diagnostic but may reveal decreased lung volumes, typically with prominent reticular interstitial markings near the lung bases.

A chest radiograph of a patient with IPF. Note the small lung fields and peripheral pattern of reticulonodular opacification.

The radiological evaluation through HRCT is an essential point in the diagnostic pathway in IPF. HRCT is performed using a conventional computed axial tomographic scanner without injection of contrast agents. Evaluation slices are very thin, 1–2 mm (0.039–0.079 in). Machine learning tools that analyze chest CT scans have been studied as aids in IPF diagnosis. In 2024, the U.S. Food and Drug Administration authorized Fibresolve, machine learning software device analyzing CT images to diagnose IPF prior to invasive testing.

Typical HRCT of the chest of IPF demonstrates fibrotic changes in both lungs, with a predilection for the bases and the periphery. According to the joint ATS/ERS/JRS/ALAT 2011 guidelines, HRCT is an essential component of the diagnostic pathway in IPF which can identify UIP by the presence of:

- Reticular opacities, often associated with traction bronchiectasis
- Honeycombing manifested as cluster cystic airspaces, typically of comparable diameters (3–10 mm (0.12–0.39 in)) but occasionally large. Usually sub-pleural and characterized by well-defined walls and disposed in at least two lines. Generally one line of cysts is not sufficient to define honeycombing
- Ground-glass opacities are common but less extensive than the reticulation
- Distribution characteristically basal and peripheral though often patchy.

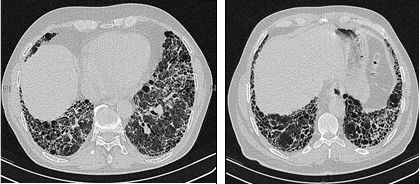
High-resolution computed tomography scans of the chest of a patient with IPF. The main features are of a peripheral, predominantly basal pattern of coarse reticulation with honeycombing

=== Histology ===
According to the updated 2011 guidelines, in the absence of a typical UIP pattern on HRCT, a surgical lung biopsy is required for confident diagnosis.

Histologic specimens for the diagnosis of IPF must be taken at least in three different places and be large enough that the pathologist can comment on the underlying lung architecture. Small biopsies, such as those obtained via transbronchial lung biopsy (performed during bronchoscopy) are usually not sufficient for this purpose. Hence, larger biopsies obtained surgically via a thoracotomy or thoracoscopy are usually necessary.

Lung tissue from people with IPF usually show a characteristic histopathologic UIP pattern and is therefore the pathologic counterpart of IPF. Although a pathologic diagnosis of UIP often corresponds to a clinical diagnosis of IPF, a UIP histologic pattern can be seen in other diseases as well, and fibrosis of known origin (rheumatic diseases for example). There are four key features of UIP including interstitial fibrosis in a 'patchwork pattern', interstitial scarring, honeycomb changes and fibroblast foci.

Fibroblastic foci are dense collections of myofibroblasts and scar tissue and, together with honeycombing, are the main pathological findings that allow a diagnosis of UIP.

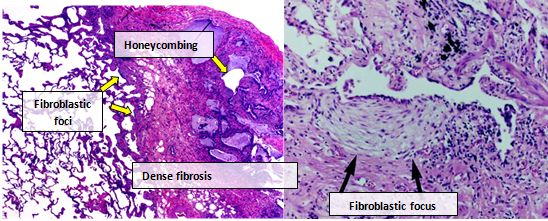
Photomicrograph of the histopathological appearances of usual interstitial pneumonia. High-power magnification (on the right) shows a focus of fibroblastic proliferation, close to an area of fibrosis within which a mild, non-specific, chronic inflammatory cell infiltrate can be observed. In the subpleural space, a typical honeycombing aspect can be recognized.

=== Bronchoalveolar lavage ===
Bronchoalveolar lavage (BAL) is a well-tolerated diagnostic procedure in ILD. BAL cytology analyses (differential cell counts) should be considered in the evaluation of patients with IPF at the discretion of the treating physician based on availability and experience at their institution. BAL may reveal alternative specific diagnoses: malignancy, infections, eosinophilic pneumonia, histiocytosis X, or alveolar proteinosis. In the evaluation of patients with suspected IPF, the most important application of BAL is in the exclusion of other diagnoses. Prominent lymphocytosis (>30%) generally allows excluding a diagnosis of IPF.

=== Pulmonary function tests ===
Spirometry classically reveals a reduction in the vital capacity (VC) with either a proportionate reduction in airflows, or increased airflows for the observed vital capacity. The latter finding reflects the increased lung stiffness (reduced lung compliance) associated with pulmonary fibrosis, which leads to increased lung elastic recoil.

Measurement of static lung volumes using body plethysmography or other techniques typically reveals reduced lung volumes (restriction). This reflects the difficulty encountered in inflating the fibrotic lungs.

The diffusing capacity for carbon monoxide (DLCO) is invariably reduced in IPF and may be the only abnormality in mild or early disease. Its impairment underlies the propensity of patients with IPF to exhibit oxygen desaturation with exercise which can also be evaluated using the 6-minute walk test (6MWT).

Terms such as 'mild', 'moderate', and 'severe' are sometimes used for staging disease and are commonly based on resting pulmonary function test measurements. However, there is no clear consensus regarding the staging of IPF patients and what are the best criteria and values to use. Mild-to-moderate IPF has been characterized by the following functional criteria:

- Forced vital capacity (FVC) of ≥50%
- DLCO of ≥30%
- 6MWT distance ≥150 meters.

== Treatment ==
The goals of treatment in IPF are essentially to reduce the symptoms, stop disease progression, prevent acute exacerbations, and prolong survival. Preventive care (e.g. vaccinations) and symptom-based treatment should be started early in every patient.

=== Oxygen therapy ===
In the 2011 IPF guidelines, oxygen therapy, or supplementary oxygen for home use, became a strong recommendation for use in those patients with significantly low oxygen levels at rest. Although oxygen therapy has not been shown to improve survival in IPF, some data indicate an improvement in exercise capacity.

=== Pulmonary rehabilitation ===
Fatigue and loss of muscular mass are common and disabling problems for patients with IPF. Pulmonary rehabilitation may alleviate the overt symptoms of IPF and improve functional status by stabilizing and/or reversing the extrapulmonary features of the disease. The number of published studies on the role of pulmonary rehabilitation in idiopathic pulmonary fibrosis is small, but most of these studies have found significant short-term improvements in functional exercise tolerance, quality of life, and dyspnea on exertion. Typical programs of rehabilitation include exercise training, nutritional modulation, occupational therapy, education and psychosocial counseling. In the late phase of disease, IPF patients tend to discontinue physical activity due to increasing dyspnea. Whenever possible, this should be discouraged.

=== Medications ===
A number of treatments have been investigated in the past for IPF, including interferon gamma-1β, bosentan, ambrisentan, and anticoagulants, but these are no longer considered effective treatment options. Many of these earlier studies were based on the hypothesis that IPF is an inflammatory disorder.

==== Pirfenidone ====
A Cochrane review comparing pirfenidone with placebo, found a reduced risk of disease progression by 30%. FVC or VC was also improved, even if a mild slowing in FVC decline could be demonstrated only in one of the two CAPACITY trials. A third study, which was completed in 2014 found reduced decline in lung function and IPF disease progression. The data from the ASCEND study were also pooled with data from the two CAPACITY studies in a pre-specified analysis which showed that pirfenidone reduced the risk of death by almost 50% over one year of treatment.

==== N-acetylcysteine and triple therapy ====
N-Acetylcysteine (NAC) is a precursor to glutathione, an antioxidant. It has been hypothesized that treatment with high doses of NAC may repair an oxidant–antioxidant imbalance that occurs in the lung tissue of patients with IPF. In the first clinical trial of 180 patients (IFIGENIA), NAC was shown in previous study to reduce the decline in VC and DLCO over 12 months of follow-up when used in combination with prednisone and azathioprine (triple therapy).

A large randomized, controlled trial (PANTHER-IPF) was undertaken by the National Institutes of Health (NIH) in the US to evaluate triple therapy and NAC monotherapy in IPF patients. This study found that the combination of prednisone, azathioprine, and NAC increased the risk of death and hospitalizations and the NIH announced in 2012 that the triple-therapy arm of the PANTHER-IPF study had been terminated early.

This study also evaluated NAC alone and the results for this arm of the study were published in May 2014, concluding that "as compared with placebo, acetylcysteine offered no significant benefit with respect to the preservation of FVC in patients with idiopathic pulmonary fibrosis with mild-to-moderate impairment in lung function".

==== Nintedanib ====
Nintedanib is a triple angiokinase inhibitor that targets receptor tyrosine kinases involved in the regulation of angiogenesis: fibroblast growth factor receptor (FGFR), platelet-derived growth factor receptor (PDGFR), and vascular endothelial growth factor receptor (VEGFR), which have also been implicated in the pathogenesis of fibrosis and IPF. In both phase III trials, nintedanib reduced the decline in lung function by approximately 50% over one year. It was approved by the US FDA in October 2014 and authorised in Europe in January 2015.

==== Nerandomilast ====
Nerandomilast (Jascayd) was approved for medical use in the United States in October 2025.

==== Rentosertib ====
Rentosertib is an investigational new drug that targets TNIK (TRAF2 and NCK-interacting protein kinase). It is asserted to be the first drug generated entirely by generative AI to reach mid-stage human clinical trials, and the first to target a novel AI-discovered biological pathway. A multicenter, double-blind, placebo-controlled, randomized phase 2a trial was conducted in China, testing the drug in 71 IPF patients from July 2023 to June 2024, encompassing an administration period of 12 weeks. Participants were randomly assigned to receive 30 mg once daily (QD), 30 mg twice daily (BID), 60 mg QD, or placebo. The trial's primary endpoint was the incidence of treatment-emergent adverse events (TEAEs).

=== Lung transplantation ===
Lung transplantation may be suitable for those patients physically eligible to undergo a major transplant operation. In IPF patients, lung transplant has been shown to reduce the risk of death by 75% as compared with patients who remain on the waiting list. Since the introduction of the lung allocation score (LAS), which prioritizes transplant candidates based on survival probability, IPF has become the most common indication for lung transplantation in the USA.

Symptomatic patients with IPF younger than 65 years of age and with a body mass index (BMI) ≤26 kg/m^{2} should be referred for lung transplantation, but there are no clear data to guide the precise timing for LTx. Although controversial, the most recent data suggest that bilateral lung transplantation is superior to single lung transplantation in patients with IPF. Five-year survival rates after lung transplantation in IPF are estimated at between 50 and 56%.

=== Palliative care ===
Palliative care focuses on reducing symptoms and improving the comfort of patients rather than treating the disease. This may include treatment of worsening symptoms with the use of chronic opioids for severe dyspnea and cough. Further, oxygen therapy may be useful for palliation of dyspnea in hypoxemic patients.

Palliative care also includes relief of physical and emotional suffering and psychosocial support for patients and caregivers. With disease progression, patients may experience fear, anxiety and depression and psychological counseling should therefore be considered. In a recent study of outpatients with ILDs, including IPF, depression score, functional status (as assessed by walk test), as well as pulmonary function, all contributed to the severity of dyspnea.

In selected cases of particularly severe dyspnea morphine could be considered. It can reduce dyspnea, anxiety and cough without significant decrease in oxygen saturation.

=== Follow-up ===
IPF is often misdiagnosed, at least until physiological and/or imaging data suggest the presence of an ILD leading to delay in accessing appropriate care. Considering that IPF is a disease with a median survival of three years after diagnosis, early referral to a center with specific expertise should therefore be considered for any patient with suspected or known ILD. On the basis of the complex differential diagnostic, multidisciplinary discussion between pulmonologists, radiologists, and pathologists experienced in the diagnosis of ILD is of the utmost importance to an accurate diagnosis.

Those with IPF have higher chances of getting lung cancer, at a rate of 13.5% where the most common cancer type is Squamous-cell carcinoma of the lung. a routine evaluation every 3 to 6 months, including spirometry (body plethysmography), diffusion capacity testing, chest X-rays, 6MWT, assessment of dyspnea, quality of life, oxygen requirement is mandatory.

In addition, the increasing awareness of complications and common concomitant conditions frequently associated with IPF requires a routinely evaluation of comorbidities, most of them simply reflecting concurrent diseases of aging, and medications with their interaction and side effects.

=== Acute exacerbations ===
Acute exacerbations of IPF (AE-IPF) are defined as an unexplained worsening or development of dyspnea within 30 days with new radiological infiltrates at HRCT abnormality often superimposed on a background consistent with UIP pattern. The yearly incidence of AE-IPF is between 10 and 15% of all patients. The prognosis of AE-IPF is poor, with mortality ranging from 78% to 96%. Other causes of AE-IPF such as pulmonary embolism, congestive heart failure, pneumothorax, or infection need to be excluded. Pulmonary infection have to be ruled out by endotracheal aspirate or BAL.

Many patients experiencing acute deterioration require intensive care treatment, particularly when respiratory failure is associated with hemodynamic instability, significant comorbidities or severe hypoxemia. However, mortality during hospitalization is high. Mechanical ventilation should be introduced only after carefully weighing the person's long-term prognosis and, whenever possible, the person's wishes. However, current guidelines discourage the use of mechanical ventilation in patients with respiratory failure secondary to IPF.

== Prognosis ==
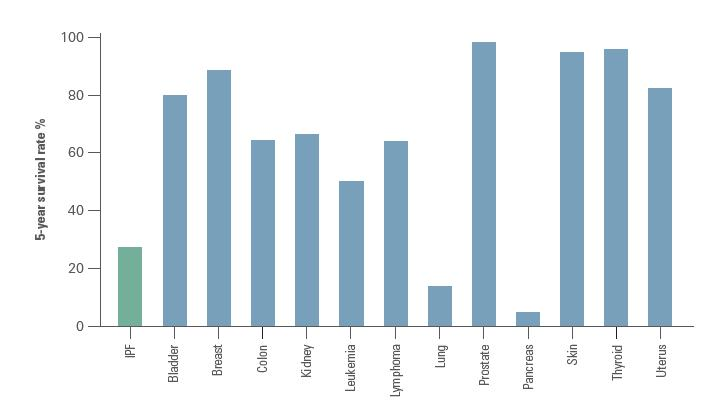
Comparison of the 5-year survival rate for IPF and common malignancies. Adapted from Bjoraker et al. 1998.

The clinical course of IPF can be unpredictable. IPF progression is associated with an estimated median survival time of 2 to 5 years following diagnosis. The 5-year survival for IPF ranges between 20 and 40%, a mortality rate higher than that of a number of malignancies, including colon cancer, multiple myeloma and bladder cancer.

A multidimensional index and staging system has been proposed to predict mortality in IPF. The name of the index is GAP and is based on gender [G], age [A], and two lung physiology variables [P] (FVC and DLCO) that are commonly measured in clinical practice to predict mortality in IPF. The highest stage of GAP (stage III) has been found to be associated with a 39% risk of mortality at 1 year. This model has also been evaluated in IPF and other ILDs and shown good performance in predicting mortality in all main ILD subtypes. A modified ILD-GAP Index has been developed for application across ILD subtypes to provide disease-specific survival estimates. In IPF patients, the overall mortality at 5 years rate is high but the annual rate of all-cause mortality in patients with mild to moderate lung impairment is relatively low. This is the reason why change in lung function (FVC) is usually measured in 1-year clinical trials of IPF treatments rather than survival.

In addition to clinical and physiological parameters to predict how rapidly patients with IPF might progress, genetic and molecular features are also associated with IPF mortality. For example, it has been shown that IPF patients who have a specific genotype in the mucin MUC5B gene polymorphism (see above) experience slower decline in FVC and significantly improved survival. Even if such data are interesting from a scientific point of view, the application in the clinical routine of a prognostic model based on specific genotypes is still not possible.

== Epidemiology ==
Although rare, IPF is the most common form of IIP. The prevalence of IPF has been estimated between 14.0 and 42.7 per 100,000 persons based on a USA analysis of healthcare claims data, with variation depending on the case definitions used in this analyses. IPF is more common in men than in women and is usually diagnosed in people over 50 years of age.

The incidence of IPF is difficult to determine as uniform diagnostic criteria have not been applied consistently. A recent study from the US estimated the incidence of IPF to be between 6.8 and 16.3 per 100,000 persons. In the 27 European Union countries, a range of sources estimate an incidence of 4.6–7.4 people per 100,000 of the population, suggesting that approximately 30,000–35,000 new patients will be diagnosed with IPF each year.

A recent single-centre, retrospective, observational cohort study including incident patients diagnosed with ILD at Aarhus University Hospital (Denmark) between 2003 and 2009 revealed an incidence of 4.1 per 100,000 inhabitants/year for ILD. IPF was the most common diagnosis (28%) followed by connective tissue disease-related ILD (14%), hypersensitivity pneumonitis (7%) and non-specific interstitial pneumonia (NSIP) (7%). IPF incidence was 1.3 per 100,000 inhabitants/year.

Due to a heterogeneous distribution of the disease across European countries, epidemiological data needs to be updated through a Europe-wide registry for ILD and IPF.

== Other animals ==
IPF has been recognized in several breeds of both dogs and cats, and has been best characterized in West Highland White Terriers. Veterinary patients with the condition share many of the same clinical signs as their human counterparts, including progressive exercise intolerance, increased respiratory rate, and eventual respiratory distress. Prognosis is generally poor.

== Research ==
A number of agents are currently being investigated in Phase II clinical trials for IPF, including the monoclonal antibodies simtuzumab, tralokinumab, lebrikizumab and FG-3019, a lysophosphatidic acid receptor antagonist (BMS-986020). A Phase II study of STX-100 is also ongoing. These molecules are directed against several growth factors and cytokines that are known to play a role in the proliferation, activation, differentiation or inappropriate survival of fibroblasts.

mir-29 microRNA precursor investigations in mice have produced reversal of induced IPF. MRG-201 is currently being tested as-of 2016, but not in IPF patients yet, and no human trials for IPF use have been scheduled as of January 2016.

Stem cell therapies for IPF are an area of research.

A machine learning algorithm has been proposed that discovers subtle patterns in individual history of medical encounters to reliably estimate the risk of a future IPF diagnosis, up to four years before current medical practice. The algorithm outputs a score (ZCoR) using medical history on file with no new tests, and might be deployable as a universal IPF screening tool in primary care. ZCoR has been trained and validated on nearly 3 million patients across multiple databases, achieving high predictive performance in out-of-sample data (positive likelihood ratio > 30 with 99% specificity). The authors conclude that past respiratory disorders maximally contribute to IPF risk, followed by known IPF comorbidities, metabolic diseases, cardiovascular abnormalities, and diseases of the eye, with the overall pattern of the importance ranking substantially invariant across the sexes.
