= Desquamative interstitial pneumonia =

- Other names: DIP
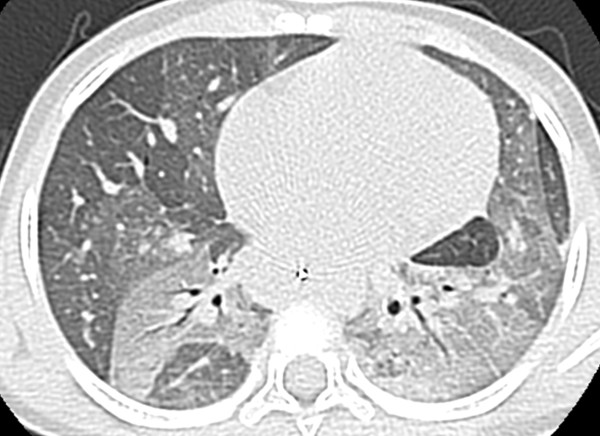
- Chest computerized tomography scan showing diffuse ground-glass opacities with air-bronchograms in the upper lobes and the left lower lobe.
- Specialty: Pulmonology

Desquamative interstitial pneumonia (DIP) is a type of idiopathic interstitial pneumonia featuring elevated numbers of macrophages within the alveoli of the lung. DIP is a chronic disorder with an insidious onset. Its common symptoms include shortness of breath, coughing, fever, weakness, weight loss, and fatigue. In more severe cases, it may lead to respiratory failure, chest pain, digital clubbing, cyanosis, and hemoptysis. Asymptomatic cases are rare.

DIP is often linked to cigarette smoking, environmental or occupational exposure, systemic disorders, and infections. Environmental risk factors include diesel or fire smoke, asbestos, and other chemicals. DIP has also been associated with certain drugs like marijuana, sirolimus, macrolides, nitrofurantoin, tocainide, and sulfasalazine. Disorders, such as hepatitis C, cytomegalovirus, systemic lupus erythematosus, connective tissue disease, and rheumatoid arthritis, have also been tied to DIP.

Diagnosis often requires surgical biopsy, especially when imaging or other tests provide non-specific results. High-resolution computed tomography (HRCT) can help identify the features of DIP. Differential diagnosis includes non-specific interstitial pneumonia, pulmonary Langerhans cell histiocytosis, respiratory bronchiolitis-associated interstitial lung disease, and hypersensitivity pneumonia. DIP is primarily treated by quitting smoking, but it may not be enough in all cases. In moderate to severe cases, corticosteroids are used. Severe DIP can be treated with lung transplants, but recurrence is possible. DIP has a favorable prognosis, with a mortality rate of 6-28% and a survival rate of 68%-94%.

== Signs and symptoms ==
Desquamative interstitial pneumonia is a chronic disorder that often has an insidious onset. The most common symptoms of DIP are shortness of breath, especially during exercise, and coughing. Non-specific symptoms such as fever, weakness, weight loss, and fatigue are common. Other symptoms include respiratory failure, chest pain, digital clubbing, cyanosis, and rarely hemoptysis. Some people with DIP may be asymptomatic, although this is rare.

== Causes ==
90% of desquamative interstitial pneumonia cases are linked to cigarette smoking. Other suggested causes of DIP include environmental or occupational exposure, systemic disorders and infections. In many cases, no specific cause can be identified, and these are classified as idiopathic.

=== Risk factors ===
Active or passive exposure to cigarette smoke is the most well-established risk factor for desquamative interstitial pneumonia. DIP has also been reported in those who do not smoke which indicates that there are other risk factors for DIP.

Occupational exposure to diesel or fire smoke, asbestos, solder smoke, silica, beryllium, nylon filaments, wood dust, graphite, talc, copper dust, aluminum, and tungsten cobalt have been associated with DIP.

DIP has also been associated with certain drugs such as marijuana, sirolimus, macrolides, nitrofurantoin, tocainide, and sulfasalazine.

Several other disorders have been linked to DIP. Infections such as hepatitis C and cytomegalovirus have been associated with DIP. Many systematic disorders such as systemic lupus erythematosus, connective tissue disease, and rheumatoid arthritis have been connected to DIP.

== Diagnosis ==
Since laboratory testing, imaging, and bronchoalveolar lavage results are often non-specific, guidelines recommend surgical biopsy to diagnose desquamative interstitial pneumonia if high-resolution computed tomography does not reveal classic signs of interstitial pneumonia. A definitive diagnosis of DIP relies on a lung biopsy.

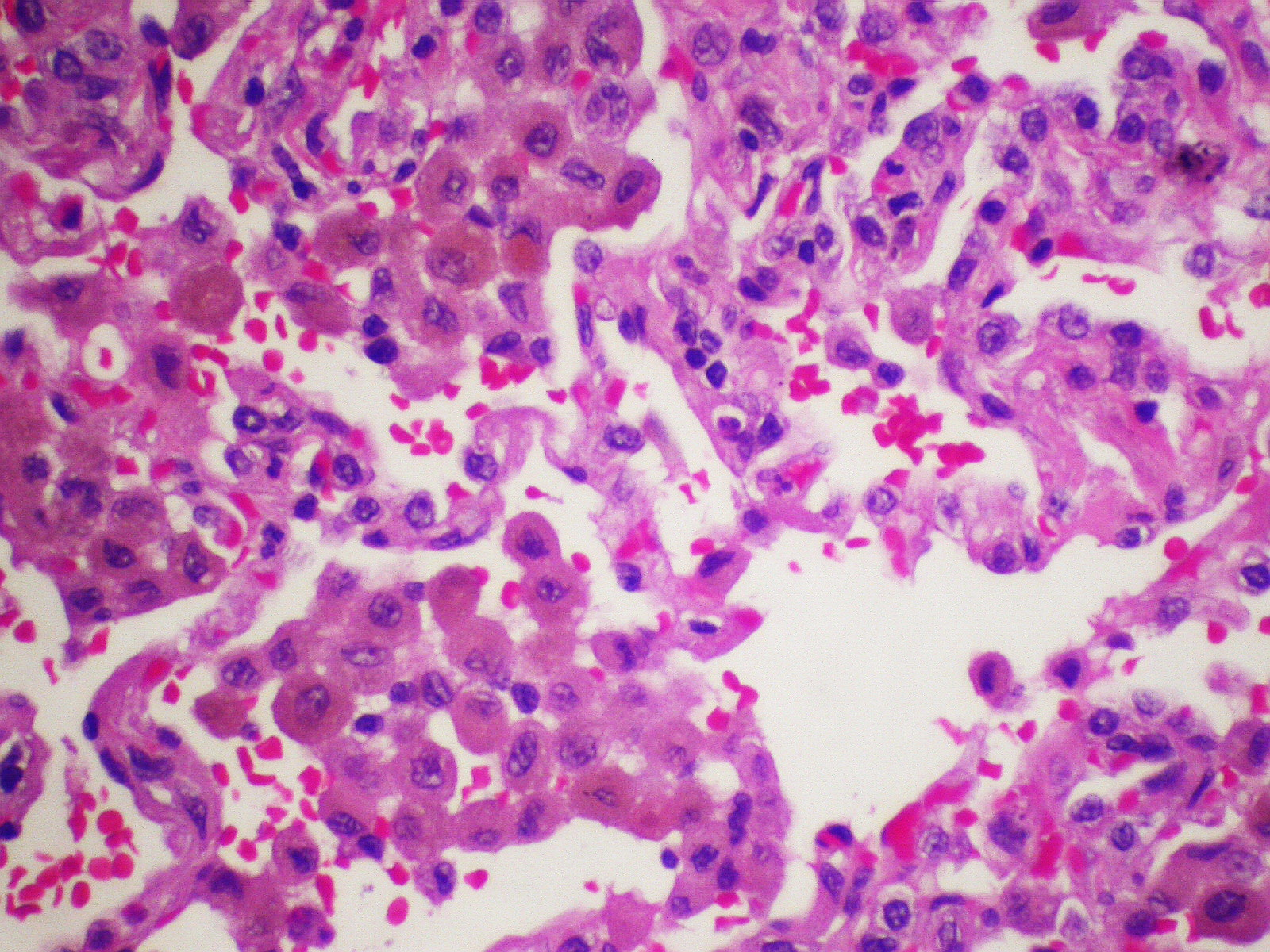
Alveoli are filled with macrophages, many containing golden brown tobacco pigment.

While some laboratory abnormalities have been reported in cases of DIP, biological analysis does not usually point toward any diagnosis. Chest X-rays often show non-specific findings or come back normal. Pulmonary function tests usually reveal a decrease in diffusion capacity and a restrictive pattern.

Thoracic high-resolution computed tomography (HRCT) often shows signs of DIP, however, HRCT has only been reported on in one study. HRCT shows a ground-glass appearance.

The major hallmark of DIP is the presence of a large number of macrophages within the alveoli that are distributed throughout the pulmonary acini. These macrophages are rich in eosinophilic cytoplasm and frequently include a coarsely granular light-brown pigment. There are usually a few multinucleated large cells. The alveolar architecture is typically intact, however there is a modest chronic inflammatory infiltration inside the interstitium. A moderate quantity of eosinophils might also be present. Lymphoid aggregates can be present.

The differential diagnosis for DIP includes non-specific interstitial pneumonia, pulmonary Langerhans cell histiocytosis, respiratory bronchiolitis-associated interstitial lung disease, and hypersensitivity pneumonia.

== Treatment ==
The main treatment for DIP is quitting smoking. Sometimes smoking cessation is successful in managing DIP however in some cases this is not enough. Avoidance of other potential environmental factors is also advised. In those who are moderately to severely symptomatic and who have not responded to quitting smoking, corticosteroids are used. Cytotoxic and immunosuppressive drugs have been used for the treatment of DIP however there is not enough evidence on their usage. In cases of severe DIP lung transplants are an option however recurrence is still possible.

== Outlook ==
Desquamative interstitial pneumonia has a favourable prognosis and most patients improve with proper treatment. The mortality rate of DIP is between 6 and 28%. The survival rate of DIP is estimated to be between 68% and 94%. Without treatment around 60% of patients get worse. Spontaneous recovery had also been reported.

== Epidemiology ==
The prevalence of desquamative interstitial pneumonia is unknown, but it most commonly affects people aged 40 to 60, with males twice as likely to have it as females. While DIP can sometimes progress rapidly, severe fibrosis is rare.

== History ==
Desquamative interstitial pneumonia was first defined by Averill Liebow et al. In 1965 Liebow described 18 patients with pulmonary lesions with large alveolar cell proliferation and desquamation. Liebow also noted that the walls of the patient's distal airways were thickened. The name "desquamative interstitial pneumonia" originated from the assumption that the disease was caused by epithelial cell desquamation.

== See also ==
- Idiopathic interstitial pneumonia
- Respiratory bronchiolitis
