= Smoking-related interstitial fibrosis (SRIF) =

Abnormal amount of collagen in the lung (fibrosis) caused by cigarette smoking

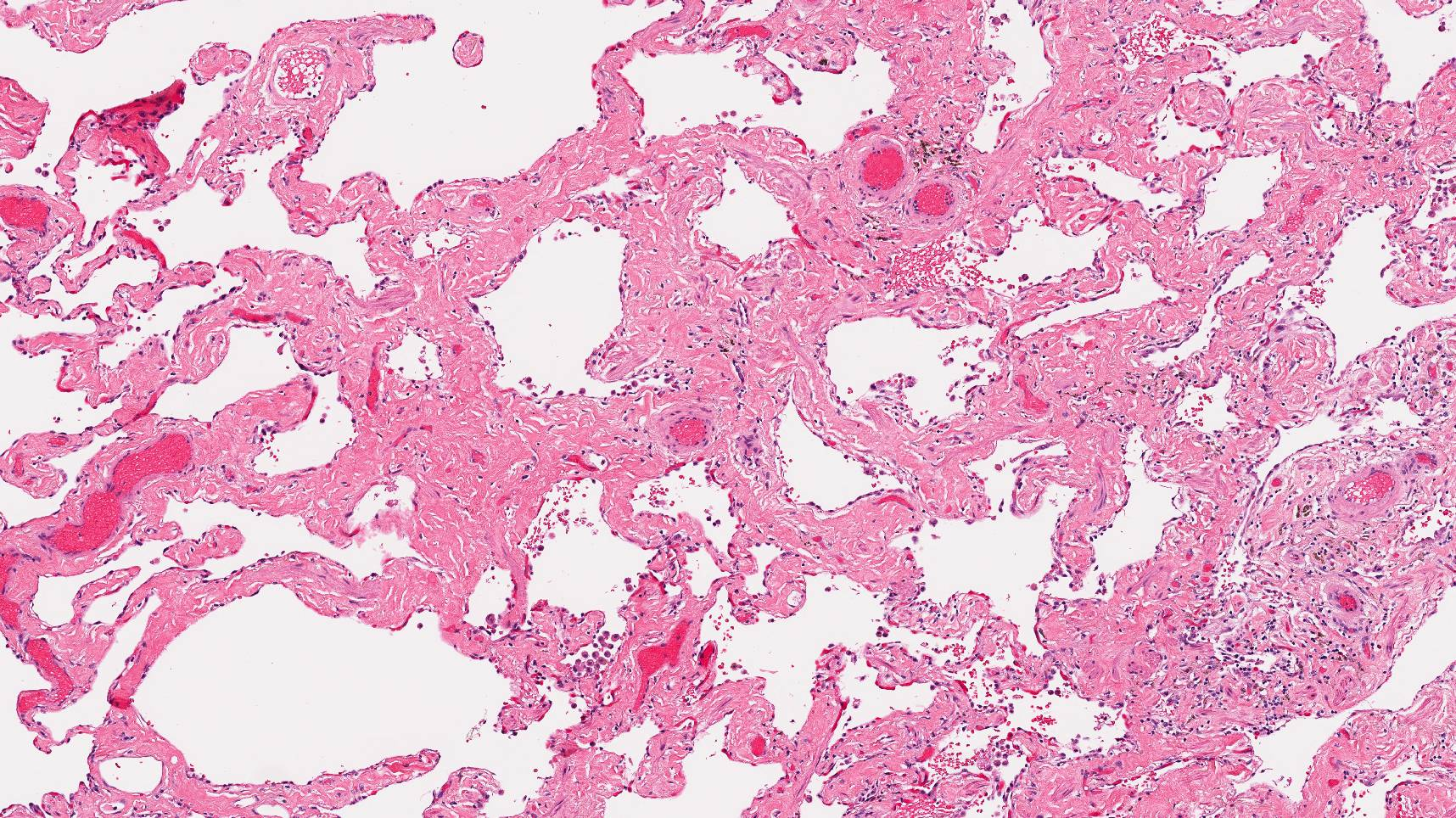
- A photomicrograph of SRIF as seen by a pathologist through a microscope. The tissue on the slide is stained with two standard dyes (hematoxylin: blue, eosin: pink) to make it visible. Note that the excess collagen in SRIF gives the air sacs a pink color.
- Specialty: Pathology
- Symptoms: Cough
- Usual onset: Gradual
- Causes: Smoking
- Diagnostic method: Pathology
- Differential diagnosis: Non-specific interstitial pneumonia (NSIP), desquamative interstitial pneumonia (DIP), respiratory bronchiolitis-interstitial lung disease (RBILD)
- Prevention: Avoidance of cigarette smoking
- Treatment: Smoking cessation
- Prognosis: Stable disease over several years
- Deaths: Not reported

Smoking-related interstitial fibrosis (SRIF) is an abnormality in the lungs characterized by excessive collagen deposition within the walls of the air sacs (interstitial fibrosis). This abnormality can be seen with a microscope and diagnosed by pathologists. It is caused by cigarette smoking.

The term SRIF was coined by Dr. Anna-Luise Katzenstein (a pathologist) and colleagues in 2010 in a study of lung specimens surgically removed for lung cancer. Since then, other investigators have confirmed the same abnormality in the lungs of a subset of smokers.

== Definition ==
The defining feature of smoking-related interstitial fibrosis is a distinctive/unique type of fibrosis characterized by "ropey" collagen bundles within the walls of the air sacs (alveoli), almost always in association with other smoking-related abnormalities such as pigmented macrophages and emphysema.

== Clinical symptoms ==
Most cases of SRIF are discovered incidentally by pathologists examining lung tissue from lungs that have been removed surgically from patients with lung cancer. These patients generally have no symptoms attributable to fibrosis, although they may have symptoms attributable to emphysema (COPD), which is a common abnormality in smokers with lung cancer. A few cases of SRIF in which patients were seen by doctors because of cough and shortness of breath have also been reported. These patients were all heavy smokers and considered to have a form of interstitial lung disease. Most were in their 40s and had abnormalities in pulmonary function tests, most commonly reduced diffusion capacity for carbon monoxide (DLCO). Their symptoms generally remained stable (did not worsen) over up to 10 years of follow-up.

== Role of smoking ==
To date, all reported patients with SRIF have been heavy current smokers or ex-smokers, lending credence to the assertion that this condition is caused by smoking. There are no published reports of SRIF in never-smokers.

== Imaging findings ==
Most cases of SRIF are not detectable clinically (clinically occult), and have no visible abnormalities on chest CT. In clinically occult cases, a range of findings have been described on CT, including no abnormalities, low attenuation areas, clustered cysts with visible walls, and ground-glass opacities with or without reticulation. In symptomatic patients, the radiologic features described on chest computed tomograms (chest CT, or CT scans of the chest) include bilateral ground-glass opacities (haziness in both lungs) and emphysema without reticulation, traction bronchiectasis or honeycombing.

== Treatment and Prognosis ==
There is very limited data on treatment and follow-up of smoking-related interstitial fibrosis. One study reported that corticosteroids were not beneficial. Smoking cessation resulted in stable/non-progressive disease after several years of follow-up. Improvements in pulmonary function tests with smoking cessation have also been documented.
