= Idiopathic interstitial pneumonia =

Class of diffuse lung diseases affecting the pulmonary interstitium

- Other names: Noninfectious pneumonia
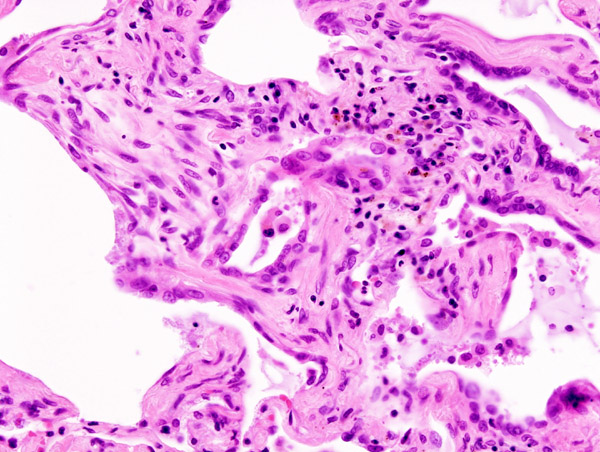
- Micrograph of usual interstitial pneumonia (UIP). UIP is the most common pattern of idiopathic interstitial pneumonia and usually represents idiopathic pulmonary fibrosis. H&E stain. Autopsy specimen.
- Specialty: Respirology

Idiopathic interstitial pneumonia (IIP), or noninfectious pneumonia are a class of diffuse lung diseases. These diseases typically affect the pulmonary interstitium, although some also have a component affecting the airways (for instance, cryptogenic organizing pneumonitis). There are seven recognized distinct subtypes of IIP.

== Diagnosis ==
Classification can be complex, and the combined efforts of clinicians, radiologists, and pathologists can help in the generation of a more specific diagnosis.

Idiopathic interstitial pneumonia can be subclassified based on histologic appearance into the following patterns:

Histology	Clinical Correlates
Desquamative interstitial pneumonia (DIP)	DIP
Diffuse alveolar damage (DAD)	ARDS, AIP, TRALI
Nonspecific interstitial pneumonia (NSIP)	NSIP
Respiratory bronchiolitis	RB-ILD
Usual interstitial pneumonia (UIP)	CVD, IPF, drug toxicity, pneumoconiosis
Organizing pneumonia	Cryptogenic organizing pneumonia
Lymphoid interstitial pneumonia (LIP)	LIP

Usual interstitial pneumonia is the most common type.

== Development ==
Table 1: Development of the (histologic) idiopathic interstitial pneumonia classification

Leibow et al. (1969)
UIP
DIP
BIP
LIP
GIP

Katzenstein (1998)
UIP
DAD
NSIP
DIP/RB
OP
(LPD)
(HMF)

ATS/ERS (2002)
UIP
DAD
NSIP
DIP
RB
OP
LIP
(HMF)

UIP=usual interstitial pneumonia; DAD=diffuse alveolar damage; NSIP=non-specific interstitial pneumonia; DIP=desquamative interstitial pneumonia; RB=respiratory bronchiolitis; BIP=bronchiolitis obliterans interstitial pneumonia; OP=organizing pneumonia; LIP=lymphoid interstitial pneumonia; LPD=lymphoproliferative disease (not considered a diffuse lung disease); GIP=giant cell interstitial pneumonia; HMF=heavy metal fibrosis, no longer grouped with diffuse lung disease

Lymphoid interstitial pneumonia was originally included in this category, then excluded, then included again.
