= NSIP =

NSIP may refer to:

- Non-specific interstitial pneumonia
- Nationally significant infrastructure project in England and Wales
