= Tocainide =

Chemical compound

Clinical data
- Trade names: Tonocard
- Other names: Tocainamide
- AHFS/Drugs.com: Micromedex Detailed Consumer Information
- MedlinePlus: a601248
- ATC code: C01BB03 (WHO)

Pharmacokinetic data
- Bioavailability: 0.9-1 (oral)
- Protein binding: 10-20%
- Metabolism: glucuronidation (primary)
- Elimination half-life: 9-14 R, 13-20 S
- Excretion: 30-50% urine (unchanged)

Identifiers
- IUPAC name: N-(2,6-dimethylphenyl)alaninamide
- CAS Number: 41708-72-9
- PubChem CID: 38945
- IUPHAR/BPS: 7309
- DrugBank: DB01056
- ChemSpider: 35632
- UNII: 27DXO59SAN
- KEGG: D06172
- ChEBI: CHEBI:9611
- ChEMBL: ChEMBL1762
- CompTox Dashboard (EPA): DTXSID9040766
- ECHA InfoCard: 100.050.441

Chemical and physical data
- Formula: C_{11}H_{16}N_{2}O
- Molar mass: 192.262 g·mol^{−1}
- 3D model (JSmol): Interactive image
- SMILES: O=C(Nc1c(cccc1C)C)C(N)C
- InChI: InChI=1S/C11H16N2O/c1-7-5-4-6-8(2)10(7)13-11(14)9(3)12/h4-6,9H,12H2,1-3H3,(H,13,14); Key:BUJAGSGYPOAWEI-UHFFFAOYSA-N

Tocainide (Tonocard) is a class Ib antiarrhythmic agent. It is no longer sold in the United States.

== Synthesis ==
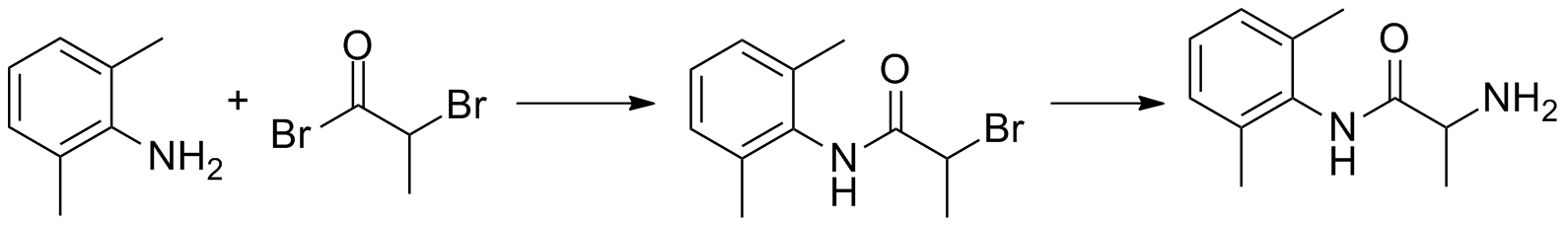
Tocainide synthesis:

== Pharmacokinetics ==
Tocainide is a lidocaine derivative, that undergoes very less first pass metabolism. It occurs as two enantiomers. The R isomer is three times more potent than the S isomer. Tocainide's oral bioavailability is almost 100%. Plasma half-life generally lasts for 11.5-15.5 hours (13.5 ± 2 hours). In the blood, tocainide is 10-20% protein bound. The volume of distribution is 2.8-3.2 L/kg. 31-45% is excreted unchanged in the urine. The more active R-isomer is cleared faster in anephric patients (without kidneys) or those with severe kidney dysfunction. The main metabolite is tocainide carbamoyl ester glucuronlde.

== Drug interactions ==
Rifampicin increases conversion of tocainide into its main metabolite, tocainide carbamoyl ester glucuronlde, by inducing the glucuronosyl transferase enzyme that catalyzes glucuronidation of tocainide to produce that metabolite. Rifampicin also increases elimination rate and decreases oral clearance of tocainide. Tocainide decreases plasma clearance of theophylline.

== See also ==
- Class I antiarrhythmic
- Mexiletine
- Lidocaine
