= Bronchiolectasis =

Disease of the lung

Bronchiolectasis is defined as the saccular dilatation of the bronchioles. While similar to bronchiectasis which affects the larger airways, bronchiolectasis affects the smaller airways, the bronchioles. It is sometimes caused by inflammatory airway disease, in which case it is potentially reversible, but more frequently and irreversibly due to fibrosis.

== Imaging ==
Bronchiolectasis is seen in CT imaging of the chest. In cases where dilated bronchioles are filled with exudate and are thick walled, they can be seen as tree-in-bud appearance. However, in traction bronchiolectasis, the dilated bronchioles are seen as small, cystic, tubular airspaces.
