= Honeycombing =

Radiologic sign indicating pulmonary fibrosis (lung scarring)

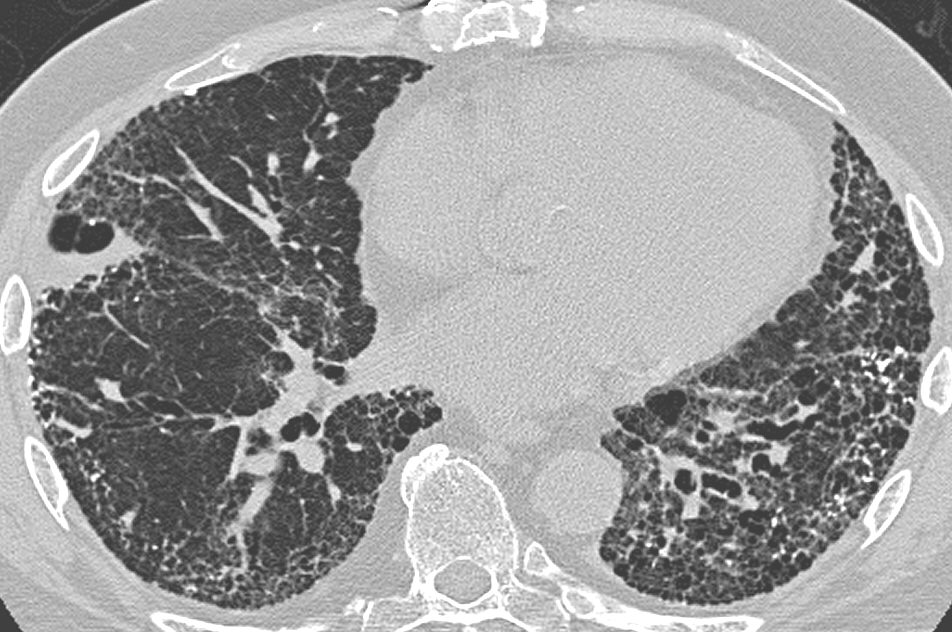
CT scan in a patient with usual interstitial pneumonia, showing interstitial thickening, architectural distortion, honeycombing and bronchiectasis.

In radiology, honeycombing or "honeycomb lung" is the radiological appearance seen with widespread pulmonary fibrosis and is defined by the presence of small cystic spaces with irregularly thickened walls composed of fibrous tissue. Dilated and thickened terminal and respiratory bronchioles produce cystic airspaces, giving a honeycomb appearance on chest x-rays. Honeycomb cysts often predominate in the peripheral and pleural/subpleural lung regions regardless of their cause.

Subpleural honeycomb cysts typically occur in several contiguous layers. This finding can allow honeycombing to be distinguished from paraseptal emphysema in which subpleural cysts usually occur in a single layer.

== Causes ==
Pneumoconiosis is a classification of interstitial lung disease caused by inhalation and accumulation of airborne particles in the lungs. Coal worker's pneumoconiosis, asbestosis, and silicosis are common forms of pneumoconiosis that have been shown to cause interstitial pulmonary fibrosis which, in advanced stages, may be observed as "honeycombing" on CT imaging.

Various medications (such as amiodarone, methotrexate, bleomycin, or TKIs) have also been linked to causing pulmonary damage leading to fibrosis and honeycombing. The mechanism of injury will vary among different medications. Bleomycin, for example, increase ROS which damage DNA. While TKIs are able to suppress proliferation of alveolar cells.

== Treatments ==
Corticosteroids may provide symptomatic relief by reducing inflammatory processes within the lungs. However, studies have shown that corticosteroids have not been successful in halting or reversing the progression of honeycombing.
