= High-resolution computed tomography =

Diagnostic imaging test

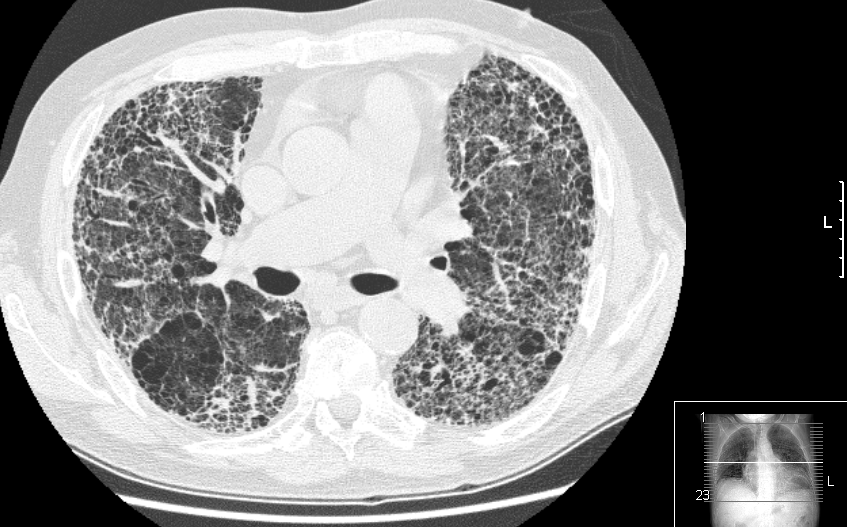
- HRCT of lung showing extensive fibrosis possibly from usual interstitial pneumonitis. There is also a large emphysematous bulla.
- ICD-9-CM: 87.41

High-resolution computed tomography (HRCT) is a type of computed tomography (CT) with specific techniques to enhance image resolution. It is used in the diagnosis of various health problems, though commonly for lung disease, by assessing the lung parenchyma. Other uses of this medical technology include HRCT of the temporal bone to diagnose various middle ear diseases such as otitis media, cholesteatoma, and evaluations after ear operations. High-resolution peripheral quantitative computed tomography (HR-pQCT), is used to detect bone microarchitecture, and model whole-bone geometry using 3-dimensional information from scans or peripheral limbs, allowing estimation of bone strength and other mechanical properties.

== Technique ==
Low-dose high-resolution (1.25 mm) chest CT

HRCT is performed using a conventional CT scanner. However, imaging parameters are chosen so as to maximize spatial resolution: a narrow slice width is used (usually 1–2 mm), a high spatial resolution image reconstruction algorithm is used, field of view is minimized, so as to minimize the size of each pixel, and other scan factors (e.g. focal spot) may be optimized for resolution at the expense of scan speed.

Depending on the suspected diagnosis, the scan may be performed in both inspiration and expiration. In inspiration images are taken in the prone position. In expiratory HRCT the scan is taken in the supine position (face up).

As HRCT's aim is to assess a generalized lung disease, the test is conventionally performed by taking thin sections which are 10–40 mm apart from each other. The result is a few images that should be representative of the lungs in general, but that cover only approximately one tenth of the lungs.

Intravenous contrast agents are not used for HRCT as the lung inherently has very high contrast (soft tissue against air), and the technique itself is unsuitable for assessment of the soft tissues and blood vessels, which are the major targets of contrast agents.

== Impact of modern CT technology ==
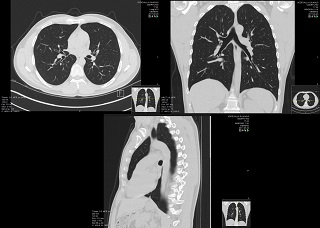
HRCT of a normal thorax, taken in the axial, coronal and sagittal planes, respectively.

The technique of HRCT was originally developed with relatively slow CT scanners, which did not make use of multi-detector (MDCT) technology. The parameters of scan duration, z-axis resolution and coverage were interdependent. To cover the chest in a reasonable time period with a conventional chest CT scan required thick sections (e.g., 10mm thick) to ensure contiguous coverage. As performing contiguous thin sections required unacceptably prolonged scan time, HRCT examination was performed with widely spaced sections. Because of the different scan parameters for conventional and HRCT examinations, if a patient required both, they had to be performed sequentially.

Modern MDCT scanners after 2005 were able to overcome this interdependence, and are capable of imaging at full resolution yet retain very fast coverage - images can then be reconstructed retrospectively from the volumetric raw data. Because of this, it may be possible to reconstruct inspiratory HRCT-like images from the data taken from a 'normal' chest CT scan.

Alternatively, the scanner could be configured to perform contiguous 1mm sections for a HRCT examination - this provides greater diagnostic information as it examines the entire lung, and permits the use of multi-planar reconstruction techniques. However, it brings the expense of irradiating the entire chest (instead of approximately 10%) when performed using widely spaced sections.

== Applications ==
HRCT is used for diagnosis and assessment of interstitial lung disease, such as pulmonary fibrosis, and other generalized lung diseases such as emphysema and bronchiectasis.

=== Lung disease ===
Airways diseases, such as emphysema or bronchiolitis obliterans, cause air trapping on expiration, even though they may cause only minor changes to lung structure in their early stages. To enhance sensitivity for these conditions, the scan may be performed in both inspiration and expiration.

HRCT may be diagnostic for conditions such as emphysema or bronchiectasis. While HRCT may be able to identify pulmonary fibrosis, it may not always be able to further categorize the fibrosis to a specific pathological type (e.g., non-specific interstitial pneumonitis or desquamative interstitial pneumonitis). The major exception is UIP, which has very characteristic features, and may be confidently diagnosed on HRCT alone.

Where HRCT is unable to reach a definitive diagnosis, it helps locate an abnormality, and so helps planning a biopsy, which may provide the final diagnosis.

Other miscellaneous conditions where HRCT is useful include lymphangitis carcinomatosa, fungal, or other atypical, infections, chronic pulmonary vascular disease, lymphangioleiomyomatosis, and sarcoidosis.

Organ transplant patients, particularly lung, or heart-lung transplant recipients, are at relatively high risk of developing pulmonary complications of the long-term drug and immunosuppressive treatment. The major pulmonary complication is bronchiolitis obliterans, which may be a sign of lung graft rejection.

HRCT has better sensitivity for bronchiolitis obliterans than conventional radiography. Some transplant centers may arrange annual HRCT to screen for this.

Diagnostic imaging, including HRCT, is one of the main diagnostic tools for COVID-19. There is some debate about the usefulness of CT compared to other methods and imaging modalities for diagnosis. Under HRCT scan, infected individuals generally showed a multifocal or unifocal involvement of ground-glass opacity (GGO).

==== Nodularity ====
The presence of lung nodules on high resolution CT is a keystone in understanding the appropriate differential. Typically, the distribution of nodules is divided into perilymphatic, centrilobular and random categories. Furthermore, nodules can be ill-defined, implying they are in the alveoli, or well defined, suggesting an interstitial position. Distribution and appearance allow understanding of the disease process relative to the secondary lobule of the lung, the smallest anatomic unit with surrounding connective tissue, usually 1–2 cm across.

Perilymphatic nodularity deposits at the periphery of the secondary lobule and tends to respect pleural surfaces and fissures. Sarcoidosis, lymphangitic spread of carcinoma, silicosis, coal worker's pneumoconiosis, and more rare diagnoses such as lymphoid interstitial pneumonitis and amyloidosis are included in the differential. Centrilobular nodularity deposits at the center of the secondary lobule, but spares pleural surfaces. Differential includes endobronchial tuberculosis, bronchopneumonia, endobronchial spread of tumor, and again silicosis or coal workers' pneumoconiosis. For randomly distributed nodules, the differential includes miliary tuberculosis, fungal pneumonia, hematogenous metastasis and diffuse sarcoidosis.

=== Prone versus supine position ===
Because the bases of the lungs lie posteriorly in the chest, a mild degree of collapse under the lungs' own weight can occur when the patient lies on their back. As the very base of the lungs may be the first region affected in several lung diseases, most notably asbestosis or usual interstitial pneumonia (UIP), the patient may be asked to lie prone to improve sensitivity to early changes of these conditions.

The lung bases are often inconsistent in appearance in patients due to the potential for atelectasis causing positional ground glass or consolidative opacities. When the patient is positioned prone, or on their belly, the lung bases can expand further and help distinguish atelectasis from early fibrosis. In patients with normal chest radiographs, prone scans have been found useful in 17% of cases, particularly in excluding posterior lung abnormalities. In patients with abnormal findings on chest radiographs, prone scans are only useful in 4% of cases. The scans may be more useful in patients with basilar predominant disease processes, such as asbestosis and idiopathic pulmonary fibrosis.

=== Temporal bone assessment ===
HRCT temporal bone scans can be used to determine the anatomy of chronic otitis media (middle ear is located inside the temporal bone), congenital abnormalities, and loss of surgical landmarks due to previous operation. Thus, HRCT is useful in surgical planning and management of temporal bone disease.

=== Peripheral bone assessment ===
High-resolution peripheral quantitative computed tomography, HR-pQCT, is used to detect bone microarchitecture, and model whole-bone geometry using 3-dimensional information from scans, and can be applied to peripheral limbs such as an arm or a leg. This method allows estimation of bone strength and other mechanical properties.

== See also ==
- Structured light plethysmography
- X-ray microtomography
- X-ray computed tomography measurement
