= Lung biopsy =

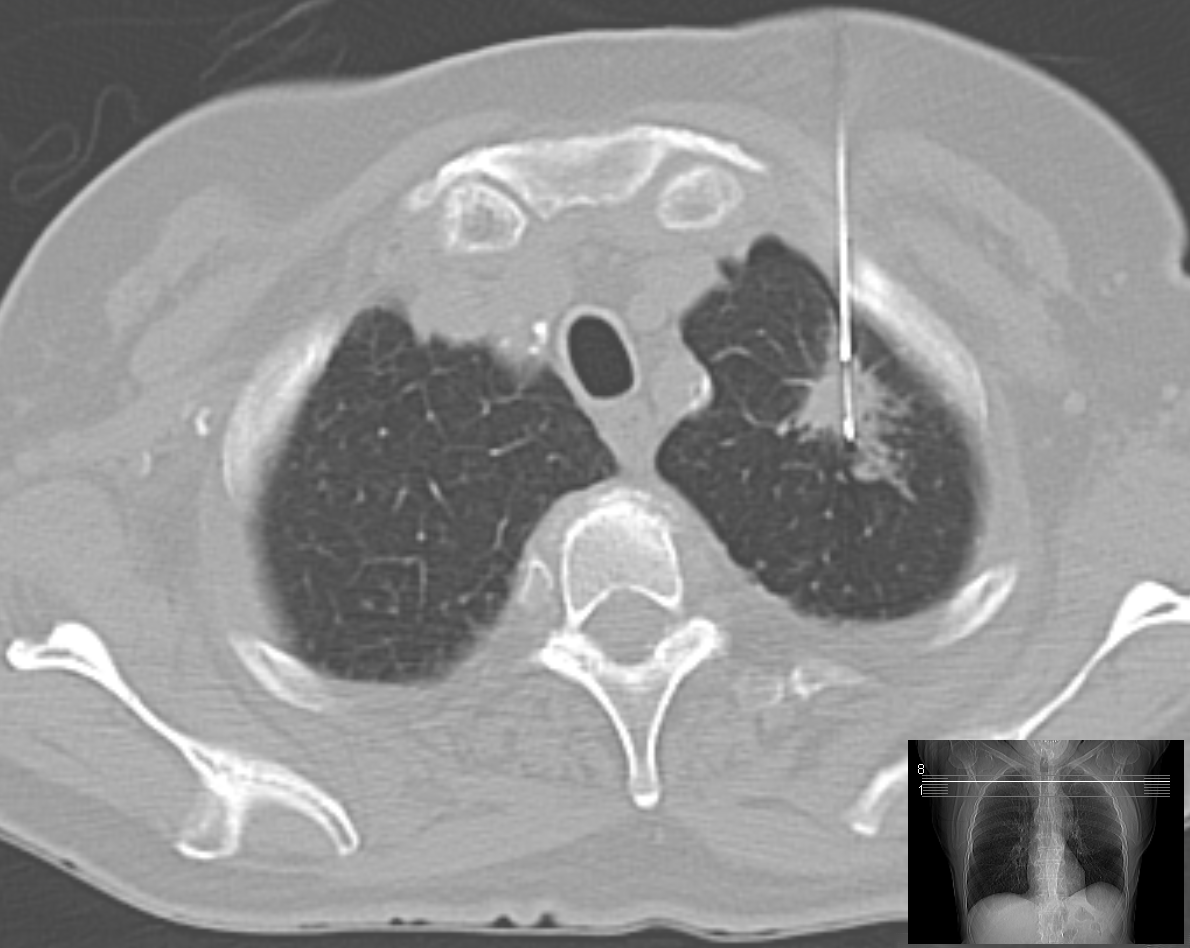
- Percutaneous lung biopsy in a case of suspected lung cancer under control of computed tomography.
- Purpose: diagnose lung pathology

A lung biopsy is an interventional procedure performed to diagnose lung pathology by obtaining a small piece of lung which is examined under a microscope. Beyond microscopic examination for cellular morphology and architecture, special stains and cultures can be performed on the tissue obtained.

== Types ==
A lung biopsy can be performed percutaneously (through the skin, typically guided by a CT Scan), via bronchoscopy with ultrasound guidance, or by surgery, either open or by video-assisted thoracoscopic surgery (VATS).

== Reasons to perform ==
A lung biopsy is performed when a lung lesion is suspicious for lung cancer, or when cancer cannot be distinguished from another disease, such as aspergillosis.

Lung biopsy also plays a role in the diagnosis of interstitial lung disease.

== Risks ==
Any approach to lung biopsy risks causing a pneumothorax. Careful technique can limit this risk, which ranges from less than 1% to about 10%. The precise risk of pneumothorax depends on technique and on underlying lung disease, as certain lung diseases such as COPD can increase the risk of pneumothorax. Pneumothorax sometimes requires treatment with a chest tube.

Bleeding can be life-threatening and can occur in 1 to 4%. Rarely, intercostal artery can be injured when biopsy needle is punctured through the back, due to variations in the course of the artery during its first 6 cm from the spine when emerged from the midline vessels such as costocervical trunk of subclavian artery and descending thoracic aorta. There is a higher chance of the artery deviated from its usual course of groove below the ribs (subcostal groove), for the ribs that are nearer to the head. Therefore, target lesions near the back of the lungs are usually avoided if possible, and the puncture should be as near to the superior margin of the ribs as possible during biopsy.
