= Non-specific interstitial pneumonia =

- Other names: Non-specific interstitial pneumonitis
- Specialty: Pulmonology

Non-specific interstitial pneumonia (NSIP) is a form of idiopathic interstitial pneumonia.

== Symptoms ==
Symptoms include cough, difficulty breathing, and fatigue.

== Causes ==
It has been suggested that idiopathic nonspecific interstitial pneumonia has an autoimmune mechanism, and is a possible complication of undifferentiated connective tissue disease; however, not enough research has been done at this time to find a cause. Patients with NSIP will often have other unrelated lung diseases like COPD or emphysema, along with other auto-immune disorders.

== Diagnosis ==
Diagnosis is made via a multi-disciplinary team review of patient history, imaging, lung function testing, and in some cases a surgical lung biopsy. While a lung biopsy is the gold standard, some clinicians opt against this due to the risks of the procedure.

Lung biopsies performed on patients with NSIP reveal two different disease patterns – cellular and fibrosing – which are associated with different prognoses. The cellular pattern displays chronic inflammation with minimal fibrosis. The fibrosing pattern displays interstitial fibrosis with various inflammation levels. Both patterns are uniform and lack the prominent fibroblastic foci that are found in other types of idiopathic interstitial pneumonia.

== Treatment ==
The mainstay of treatment is corticosteroids such as prednisolone, with immunosuppressant medications such as azathioprine, and mycophenolate added in some cases. Some patients may require oxygen as their disease progresses.

== Prognosis ==
The fibrosing pattern of NSIP has a five-year survival rate of 86% to 92%, while the cellular pattern of NSIP has a 100% five-year survival rate. Patients with NSIP (whether cellular or fibrosing), have a better prognosis than those with usual interstitial pneumonia (UIP).
