= Occupational lung disease =

Lung condition caused by exposure to hazardous materials in a workplace

Occupational lung diseases comprise a broad group of diseases, including occupational asthma, industrial bronchitis, chronic obstructive pulmonary disease (COPD), bronchiolitis obliterans, inhalation injury, interstitial lung diseases (such as pneumoconiosis, hypersensitivity pneumonitis, lung fibrosis), infections, lung cancer and mesothelioma. These can be caused directly or due to immunological response to an exposure to a variety of dusts, chemicals, proteins or organisms. Occupational cases of interstitial lung disease may be misdiagnosed as COPD, idiopathic pulmonary fibrosis, or a myriad of other diseases; leading to a delay in identification of the causative agent.

== Types ==
=== Asthma ===
Asthma is a respiratory disease that can begin or worsen due to exposure at work and is characterized by episodic narrowing of respiratory airways. Occupational asthma has a variety of causes, including sensitization to a specific substance, causing an allergic response; or a reaction to an irritant that is inhaled in the workplace. Exposure to various substances can also worsen pre-existing asthma. People who work in isocyanate manufacturing, who use latex gloves, or who work in an indoor office environment are at higher risk for occupational asthma than the average US worker. Approximately 2 million people in the US have occupational asthma.

=== Bronchiolitis obliterans ===
Bronchiolitis obliterans, also known as constrictive bronchiolitis or obliterative bronchiolitis, is a respiratory disease caused by injury to the smallest airways, called bronchioles. It has been reported to occur from exposure to inhaled toxins and gases including sulfur mustard gas, nitrogen oxides, diacetyl (used in many food and beverage flavorings), 2,3-pentanedione, fly ash and fiberglass.

=== COPD ===
Chronic obstructive pulmonary disease is a respiratory disease that can encompass chronic bronchitis and/or emphysema. 15% of the cases of COPD in the United States can be attributed to occupational exposure, including exposure to silica and coal dust. People who work in mining, construction, manufacturing (specifically textiles, rubber, plastic, and leather), building, and utilities are at higher risk for COPD than the average US worker.

=== Hypersensitivity pneumonitis ===
Hypersensitivity pneumonitis (HP; also called allergic alveolitis, bagpipe lung, or extrinsic allergic alveolitis, EAA) is an inflammation of the alveoli within the lung caused by hypersensitivity to inhaled organic dusts.

=== Lung cancer ===
Numerous categories of ionizing radiation, chemicals and mixtures, occupational exposures, metals, dust and fibers have been linked to occurrence of lung cancer.

=== Mesothelioma ===
Mesothelioma is a cancer of the mesothelium, part of which is the pleura, the lining of the lungs. Mesothelioma is caused by exposure to asbestos.

=== Pneumoconiosis ===
Pneumoconiosis are occupational lung diseases that are caused due to accumulation of dust in the lungs and body's reaction to its presence. Most common pneumoconiosis are silicosis, coal workers’ pneumoconiosis (CWP), and asbestosis. Other examples include minerals (such kaolin, talc, mica), beryllium lung disease, hard metal disease and silicon carbide pneumoconiosis.

== Environmental exposure ==
=== Arsenic ===
Arsenic is classified as an IARC Group 1 carcinogen and is a cause of lung cancer. Workers can be exposed to arsenic through work with some pesticides or in copper smelting.

=== Asbestos ===
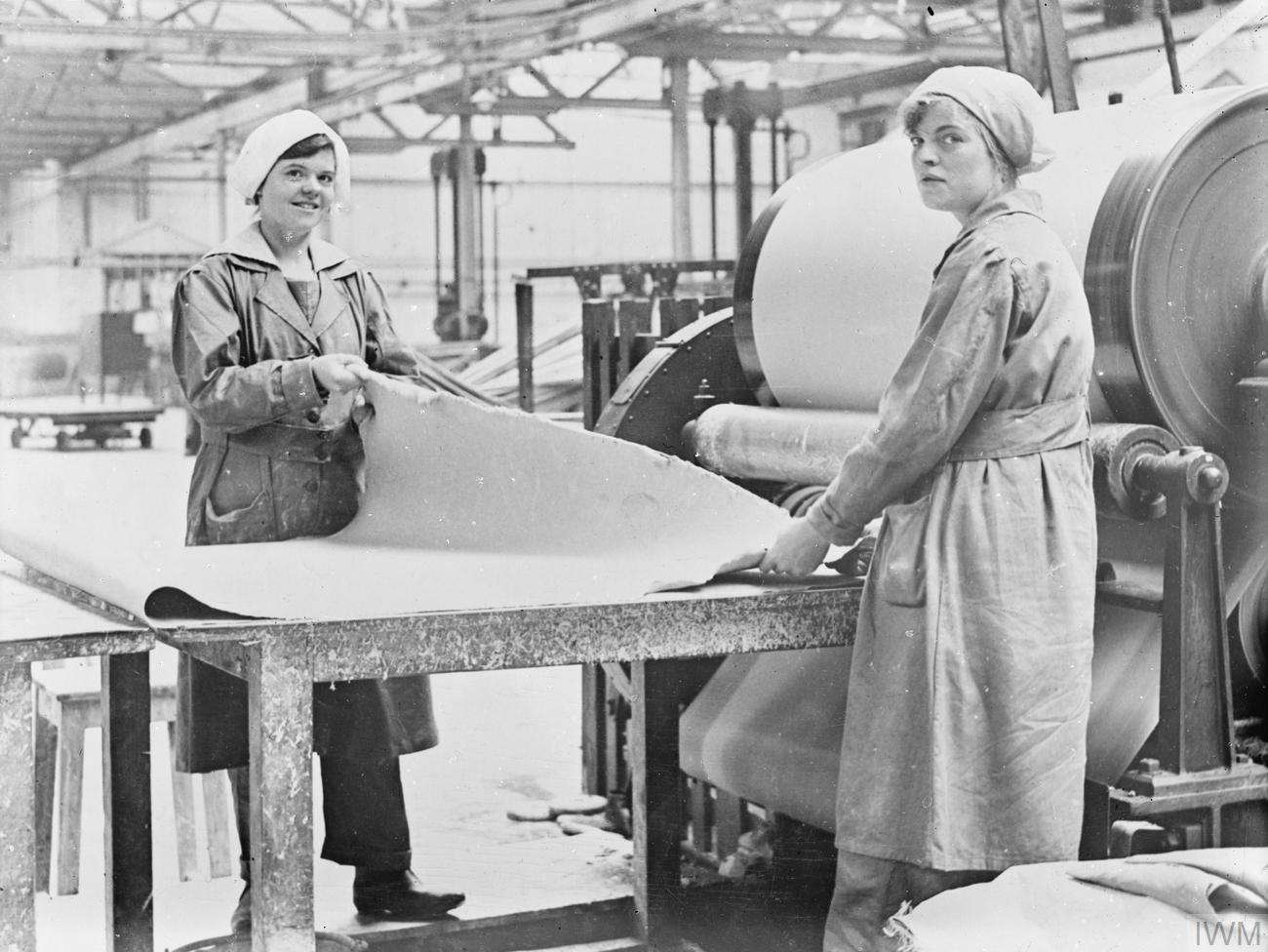
Factory workers in England removing sheets of asbestos from a machine, September 1918. Many workers and miners died early deaths from asbestos-related diseases.

Asbestos is a mineral which was extensively used in the United States to fireproof buildings and textiles, among other items, in the 1950s-1980s. Workers are frequently exposed to asbestos during demolition and renovation work, which can cause asbestosis and/or mesothelioma. Asbestos exposure can also cause pleural effusion, diffuse pleural fibrosis, pleural plaques, and non-mesothelioma lung cancer. Smoking greatly increases the lung cancer risk of asbestos exposure.

Residents and workers of asbestos mining centers such as the town of Asbest, Russia experience dangerous exposure to asbestos and asbestos dust.

=== BCME ===
BCME (Bis(chloromethyl) ether) is associated with small cell lung cancer in workers who have been exposed. Exposure can occur via direct manufacture of BCME or its presence as a byproduct.

=== Beryllium ===
Beryllium is classified as an IARC Group 1 carcinogen and can also cause interstitial lung disease. Manufacturing workers, dental technicians, machinists, jewelers, plumbers, electricians, precious metal reclamation workers, and welders are at risk for beryllium exposure.

=== Cadmium ===
Cadmium is classified as an IARC Group 1 carcinogen and it is a cause of several cancers, including lung cancer. Workers can be exposed to cadmium through welding, zinc smelting, copper smelting, lead smelting, electroplating, battery manufacture, plastics manufacture, and in alloying.

=== Chromium ===
Chromium is classified as an IARC Group 1 carcinogen and is linked to lung cancer. Workers can be exposed to chromium via welding, steel manufacturing, pigment/dye manufacturing, and electroplating.

=== Coal dust ===
Exposure to coal dust is the cause of coalworker's pneumoconiosis, also called "black lung disease", is an interstitial lung disease caused by long-term exposure (over 10 years) to coal dust. Symptoms include shortness of breath and lowered pulmonary function. It can be fatal when advanced. Between 1970 and 1974, prevalence of CWP among US coal miners who had worked over 25 years was 32%; the same group saw a prevalence of 9% in 2005–2006. It can also exacerbate or cause COPD.

=== Diesel exhaust ===
Diesel exhaust contains a variety of gaseous and particulate chemicals, including soot, polycyclic aromatic hydrocarbons, and other known carcinogens.

=== Flock ===
Flocking is the technique of adding small pieces of nylon or other material to a backing, usually a textile, to create a contrasting texture. Inhalation of flock can cause flock worker's lung.

=== Indium lung ===
Indium lung is an interstitial lung disease caused by occupational exposure to indium tin oxide.

=== Nanoparticles ===
The high surface area to volume ratio of nanoparticles may make them an inhalation hazard for workers exposed to them. This is a topic of ongoing research as of 2015 and 2023.https://www.frontiersin.org/journals/bioengineering-and-biotechnology/articles/10.3389/fbioe.2023.1199230/full

=== Nickel ===
Nickel is classified by the IARC as a Group 1 carcinogen; nickel compound exposure is associated with nasal cancer as well as lung cancer. Workers may be exposed to nickel in machining/grinding industry, nickel extraction/production, welding, and electroplating.

=== Polycyclic aromatic hydrocarbons ===
Polycyclic aromatic hydrocarbons (PAHs), fused-ring chemicals formed during the combustion of fossil fuels, are metabolized by the cytochrome P450 complex to highly reactive carbocations, which can mutate DNA and cause cancer. Workers may be exposed to PAHs while working in a foundry, in the roofing industry, or due to environmental tobacco smoke.

=== Silica ===
Exposure to silica can cause Silicosis, which is a fibrosing interstitial lung disease caused by inhaling fine particles of silica, most commonly in the form of quartz or cristobalite. Short-term exposures of large amounts of silica or long-term (10 years or more) exposure of lower levels of silica can cause silicosis. In 1968, more than 1060 US workers died of silicosis; this number fell to 170 by 2005.

Besides causing silicosis, inhalation of silica can cause or exacerbate COPD. It can also impair lung function in general and cause cancer by oxidation damage. It is classified as a "known human carcinogen" (Group 1 carcinogen) by the IARC. Exposure is common for people working in tunneling, quarrying, construction, sandblasting, roadway repair, mining, and foundry work.

=== Silo-filler's disease ===
Silo-filler's disease (not to be confused with farmer's lung, associated with inhalation of biologic dusts) results from inhalation of nitrogen dioxide (NO_{2}) gas from fresh silage. The presentation is variable depending on level of exposure. Often the gas penetrates throughout the lung and if severe can manifest as a form of acute respiratory distress syndrome, such as significant pulmonary edema, hyalinized alveolar membranes, congestion and other respiratory illnesses.

=== Tobacco smoke ===
Tobacco smoke is a known carcinogen. Workers in the hospitality industry may be exposed to tobacco smoke in the workplace, especially in environments like casinos and bars/restaurants.

== Infectious exposure ==
=== Influenza ===
Health care professionals are at risk of occupational influenza exposure; during a pandemic influenza, anyone in a close environment is at risk, including those in an office environment.

=== Tuberculosis ===
Tuberculosis is a lung disease endemic in many parts of the world. Health care professionals and prison guards are at high risk for occupational exposure to tuberculosis, since they work with populations with high rates of the disease.

== Others ==
=== World Trade Center lung ===
World Trade Center lung is a cluster of diseases caused by exposure to fallout at Ground Zero of the September 11 attacks in 2001. These diseases include asthma, asthmatic bronchitis, terminal airways disease, sarcoidosis, and acute eosinophilic pneumonia.

== Examples ==
- Pneumoconiosis
  - Asbestosis
  - Baritosis
  - Bauxite fibrosis
  - Berylliosis
  - Caplan's syndrome
  - Chalicosis
  - Coalworker's pneumoconiosis (black lung)
  - Siderosis
  - Silicosis
  - Byssinosis
- Hypersensitivity pneumonitis
  - Bagassosis
  - Bird fancier's lung
  - Farmer's lung
