= Pneumoconiosis =

Scarring of the lungs due to inhaling dust over long periods

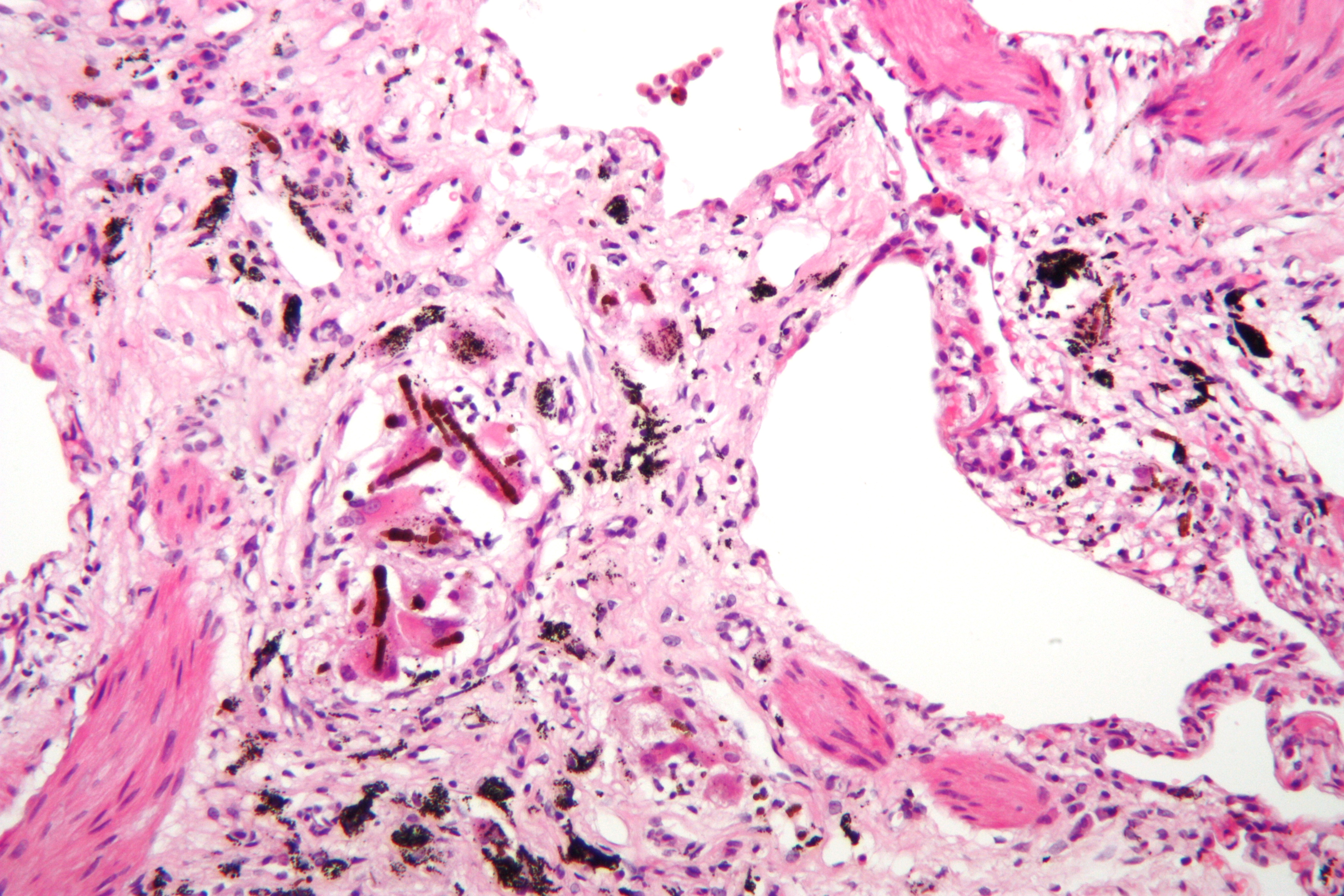
- Micrograph of asbestosis (with ferruginous bodies), a type of pneumoconiosis. H&E stain.
- Specialty: Pulmonology

Pneumoconiosis is a class of interstitial lung disease where inhalation of dust (for example, ash dust, lead particles, pollen grains etc) has caused interstitial fibrosis. The three most common types are asbestosis, silicosis, and black lung disease. Pneumoconiosis often causes restrictive impairment, although diagnosable pneumoconiosis can occur without measurable impairment of lung function. Depending on extent and severity, it may cause death within months or years, or it may never produce symptoms. It is usually an occupational lung disease, typically from years of dust exposure during work in mining; textile milling; shipbuilding, ship repairing, and/or shipbreaking; sandblasting; industrial tasks; rock drilling (subways or building pilings); or agriculture. It is one of the most common occupational diseases in the world.

== Types ==
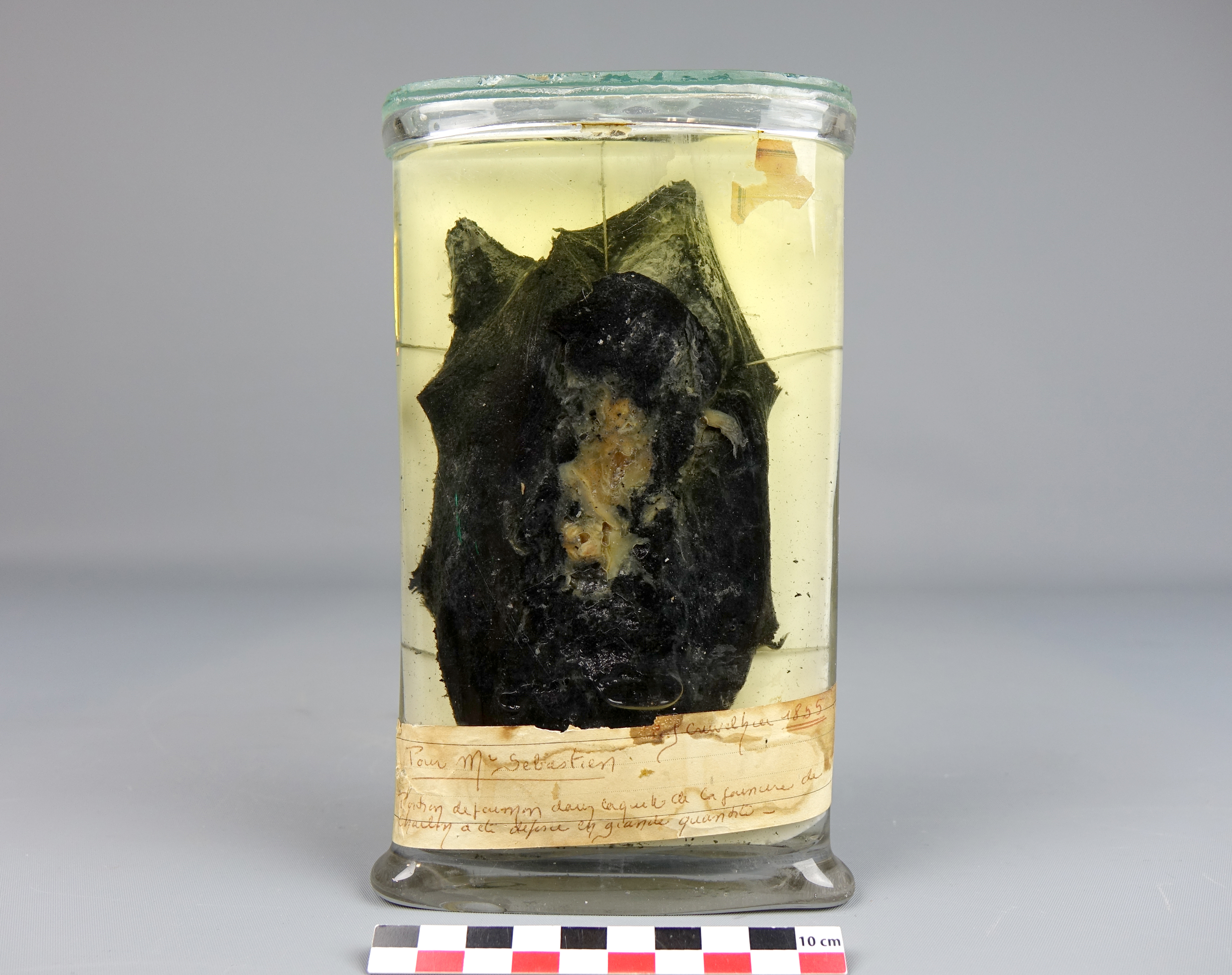
Deposition of coal dust in the lungs, 1855 (Sorbonne University).

Depending upon the type of dust, the disease is given different names:

- Coalworker's pneumoconiosis (CWP) / Black Lung Disease: Resulting from prolonged inhalation of coal dust, CWP leads to lung inflammation and fibrosis. Over time, this scarring impairs respiratory function, causing symptoms such as chronic cough and shortness of breath. Predominantly affects coal miners, especially those engaged in underground mining operations where coal dust exposure is significant.
- Aluminosis – Aluminium
- Asbestosis – asbestos: Develops from inhaling asbestos fibers, leading to lung tissue scarring and reduced lung function. Symptoms include shortness of breath, persistent cough, and chest tightness. Historically prevalent among workers in shipbuilding, construction, and manufacturing, especially those handling insulation materials containing asbestos.
- Silicosis (also known as "grinder's disease" or Potter's rot) – crystalline silica dust: Caused by inhalation of crystalline silica particles, silicosis leads to lung inflammation and scarring. Early symptoms include coughing and shortness of breath, which can progress to severe respiratory impairment. Common among workers in construction, mining, and tunneling, particularly those involved in activities like stone cutting, sandblasting, and drilling, where silica dust is prevalent.
- Bauxite fibrosis – bauxite
- Berylliosis – beryllium: A chronic lung disease caused by inhaling beryllium dust or fumes, leading to granuloma formation and lung scarring. Symptoms include cough, shortness of breath, fatigue, and chest pain. Common in aerospace, nuclear, and manufacturing industries where beryllium is used, such as in the production of electronics and precision instruments.
- Siderosis – iron
- Byssinosis – Byssinosis: (Brown Lung Disease) is caused by cotton dust inhalation and typically demonstrates a different pattern of lung abnormalities from most other pneumoconiosis. Associated with exposure to cotton, flax, or hemp dust, byssinosis causes chest tightness, coughing, and wheezing. Symptoms often worsen at the beginning of the workweek, a phenomenon known as "Monday fever". Primarily affects textile workers, particularly those involved in processing raw cotton or other fibers in mills and factories.
- Chalicosis – fine dust from stonecutting
- Silicosiderosis (also sometimes called iron miner's lung) – mixed dust containing silica and iron
- Labrador lung (found in miners in Labrador, Canada) – mixed dust containing iron, silica and anthophyllite, a type of asbestos
- Stannosis – tin oxide
- Talcosis – talc
- Baritosis - a benign type of pneumoconiosis caused by barium inhalation; it typically causes little or no overgrowth, hardening, and/or fibrosis.
- Mixed-dust pneumoconiosis

== Pathogenesis ==
The reaction of the lung to mineral dusts depends on many variables, including size, shape, solubility, and reactivity of the particles. For example, particles greater than 5 to 10 μm are unlikely to reach distal airways, whereas particles smaller than 0.5 μm move into and out of alveoli, often without substantial deposition and injury. Particles that are 1 to 5 μm in diameter are the most dangerous, because they lodge at the bifurcation of the distal airways. Coal dust is relatively inert, and large amounts must be deposited in the lungs before lung disease is clinically detectable. Silica, asbestos, and beryllium are more reactive than coal dust, resulting in fibrotic reactions at lower concentrations. Most inhaled dust is entrapped in the mucus blanket and rapidly removed from the lung by ciliary movement. However, some of the particles become stuck at alveolar duct bifurcations, where macrophages accumulate and engulf the trapped particulates. The pulmonary alveolar macrophage is a key cellular element in the initiation and perpetuation of lung injury and fibrosis. Many particles activate the inflammasome and induce IL-1 production. The more reactive particles trigger the macrophages to release a number of products that mediate an inflammatory response and initiate fibroblast proliferation and collagen deposition. Some of the inhaled particles may reach the lymphatics either by direct drainage or within migrating macrophages and thereby initiate an immune response to components of the particulates and/or to self-proteins that are modified by the particles. This then leads to an amplification and extension of the local reaction. Tobacco smoking worsens the effects of all inhaled mineral dusts, more so with asbestos than with any other particle.

== Diagnosis ==
Typical indications on patient assessment include:

- Cough
- Shortness of breath
- Chest tightness
- Chest X-ray may show a characteristic patchy, subpleural, bibasilar interstitial infiltrates or small cystic radiolucencies called honeycombing, particularly in advanced disease.

Pneumoconiosis in combination with multiple pulmonary rheumatoid nodules in rheumatoid arthritis patients is known as Caplan's syndrome.

== Epidemiology ==
The prevalence as of 2021 of pneumoconiosis is around 527,500 cases, with over 60,000 new patients reported globally in 2017. Prevalence has trended somewhat downward since 2015. The mortality of pneumoconiosis patients remained at a high level in recent years, with over 21,000 deaths each year since 2015. It is likely that pneumoconiosis is under-diagnosed and under-reported, especially in countries without highly developed healthcare systems.

== Treatment and prognosis ==
Lung damage due to pneumoconiosis cannot be reversed. However, some steps can slow down disease progression and relieve symptoms. These include the prescription of medications and breathing treatments to open airways and reduce inflammation. Pulmonary rehabilitation and supplemental oxygen may also be recommended. A lung transplant may be needed in cases of serious diseases. If the patient smokes, smoking cessation is also important. Regular testing, such as X-rays or lung function tests, may be indicated to monitor disease progression.

== Prevention ==
To reduce the likelihood of developing pneumoconiosis, individuals working in affected industries should wear a mask, wash skin that comes in contact with dust, remove dust from clothing and wash the face and hands before eating or drinking. In addition, governments often regulate industry, especially mines, to limit how much dust is in the air. In the United States, coal miners injured by pneumoconiosis and their families may receive monthly payments and medical benefits under the Black Lung Benefits Act.

== See also ==
- Black Lung Benefits Act of 1972
- Philip D'Arcy Hart
- Pneumonoultramicroscopicsilicovolcanoconiosis
- Popcorn workers' lung disease — diacetyl emissions and airborne dust from butter flavorings used in microwave popcorn production
