= Caplan's syndrome =

- Other names: Rheumatoid pneumoconiosis
- Specialty: Rheumatology

Caplan's syndrome (or Caplan disease or rheumatoid pneumoconiosis) is a combination of rheumatoid arthritis (RA) and pneumoconiosis that manifests as intrapulmonary nodules, which appear homogeneous and well-defined on chest X-ray.

== Signs and symptoms ==
Caplan syndrome presents with cough and shortness of breath in conjunction with features of rheumatoid arthritis, such as painful joints and morning stiffness. Examination should reveal tender, swollen metacarpophalangeal joints and rheumatoid nodules; auscultation of the chest may reveal diffuse crackles that do not disappear on coughing or taking a deep breath.

Caplan syndrome is a nodular condition of the lung occurring in dust-exposed persons with either a history of rheumatoid arthritis (RA) or who subsequently develop RA within the following 5–10 years. The nodules in the lung typically occur bilaterally and peripherally, on a background of simple coal workers' pneumoconiosis. There are usually multiple nodules, varying in size from 0.5 to 5.0 cm. The nodules typically appear rapidly, often in only a few weeks. Nodules may grow, remain unchanged in size, resolve, or disappear and then reappear. They can cavitate, calcify, or develop air-fluid levels. Grossly, they can resemble a giant silicotic nodule. Histologically, they usually have a necrotic center surrounded by a zone of plasma cells and lymphocytes, and often with a peripheral inflammatory zone made of macrophages and neutrophils.

== Causes ==
Caplan syndrome occurs only in patients with both RA and pneumoconiosis related to mining dust (coal, asbestos, silica). The condition occurs in miners (especially those working in anthracite coal-mines), asbestosis, silicosis and other pneumoconioses. There is probably also a genetic predisposition, and smoking is thought to be an aggravating factor.

== Pathophysiology ==
The presence of rheumatoid arthritis alters how a person's immune system responds to foreign materials, such as dust from a coal mine. When a person with rheumatoid arthritis is exposed to such offensive materials, they are at an increased risk of developing pneumoconiosis.

== Diagnosis ==
- Chest radiology shows multiple, round, well defined nodules, usually 0.5–2.0 cm in diameter, which may cavitate and resemble tuberculosis.
- Lung function tests may reveal a mixed restrictive and obstructive ventilatory defect with a loss of lung volume. There may also be irreversible airflow limitation and a reduced DLCO.
- Rheumatoid factor, antinuclear antibodies, and non-organ specific antibodies may be present in the serum.
- Silicosis and asbestosis must be considered in the differential with TB.

== Management ==
Once tuberculosis has been excluded, treatment is with steroids. All exposure to coal dust must be stopped, and smoking cessation should be attempted. Rheumatoid arthritis should be treated normally with early use of DMARDs.

== Prognosis ==
The nodules may predate the appearance of rheumatoid arthritis by several years. Otherwise prognosis is as for RA; lung disease may remit spontaneously, but pulmonary fibrosis may also progress.

== Epidemiology ==
Incidence is currently 1 in 100,000 people but is likely to fall as the coal mining industry declines. It has also been shown to occur in cases of complicated silicosis (marked by progressive massive pneumoconiosis).

== History ==
The syndrome is named after Dr. Anthony Caplan, a physician on the Cardiff Pneumoconiosis Panel, who identified the constellation of findings as a distinct entity in a 1953 publication. He followed this with further articles exploring the disease. Caplan syndrome was originally described in coal miners with progressive massive fibrosis.
