= Computed tomography of the chest =

Respiratory system imaging

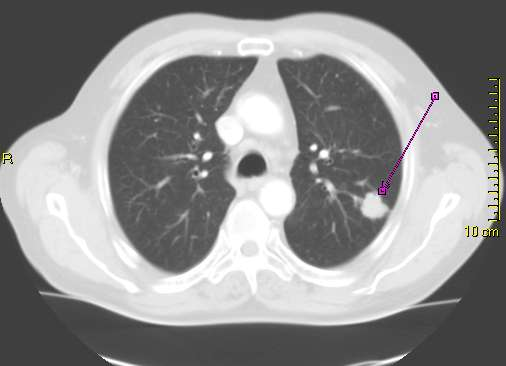
A "lung window" CT scan showing a lung cancer in the left lung

Computed tomography of the chest or chest CT is a group of computed tomography scan protocols used in medical imaging to evaluate the lungs and search for lung disorders.

Contrast agents are sometimes used in CT scans of the chest to accentuate or enhance the differences in radiopacity between vascularized and less vascularized structures, but a standard chest CT scan is usually non-contrasted (i.e. "plain") and relies on different algorithms to produce various series of digitalized images known as view or "window". Modern detail-oriented scans such as high-resolution computed tomography (HRCT) is the gold standard in respiratory medicine and thoracic surgery for investigating disorders of the lung parenchyma (alveoli).

Contrasted CT scans of the chest are usually used to confirm diagnosis of for lung cancer and abscesses, as well as to assess lymph node status at the hila and the mediastinum. CT pulmonary angiogram, which uses time-matched ("phased") protocols to assess the lung perfusion and the patency of great arteries and veins, particularly to look for pulmonary embolism.
