= Stannosis =

Stannosis (lung)
- Specialty: Pulmonology
- Symptoms: Cough, shortness of breath, chest tightness
- Causes: Exposure to tin oxides
- Diagnostic method: Radiographic appearance of multiple dense lung nodules

Stannosis is an occupational, non-fibrotic pneumoconiosis caused by chronic exposure and inhalation of tin. Pneumoconiosis is essentially when inorganic dust is found on the lung tissue; in this case, caused by tin oxide minerals. Dust particles and fumes from tin industries, stannous oxide (SnO) and stannic oxide (SnO_{2}), are specific to stannosis diagnoses. Hazardous occupations such as, tinning, tin-working, and smelting are where most cases of stannosis are documented. When melted tin ions are inhaled as a fume, the tin oxides deposit onto the lung nodules and immune response cells. If a worker is exposed to tin oxides over multiple events for an extended time, they are at risk of developing stannosis.

== Toxicology and physiology ==
Workers with acute exposures, short duration with varying dose concentrations, to tin oxides develop a mild irritation on the eyes, skin, and mucous membranes. When the inorganic metal materials are inhaled, the body activates the immune system and sends macrophages to the lungs. The macrophages try removing xenobiotic particles; however, stannous and stannic oxide interferes with the cells function. Tin deposition on lung nodules becomes apparent after X-ray imaging, although the stannosis does not appear to damage the lung tissues. Since the macrophages are laden with tin oxides but little to no fibrosis, stannosis is classified as a non-fibrotic pneumoniosis. Stannosis is a rare disease with only case-by-case appearances throughout history. Therefore, a diagnostic treatment plan has not yet been created by health officials.

== Characteristics of Tin for industrial uses ==
Tin oxide metals are used for their variable valence state and positive charge deficit from their oxygen vacancy. When heated to temperatures above 2602 °C or 2875 K, tin oxides start to boil and produce fumes. For example, tin forms Sn_{2} when heated in oxygenated environments; also called feebly acid. Tin oxide is known for being a good catalyst in solid photochemical reactions (photocatalysis) and electric production from light (photoelectrocatalysis). The energy produced form splitting water in photoelectrocatalysis is used for the creation of dehydrated dyes.

Tin is found in nature as an off-white or gray crystal mineral called cassiterite. The corrosion resistant metal is harvested primarily in Malaya, Bolivia, Indonesia, Zaire, Thailand, and Nigeria. Traditionally, tin was used to create containers; however, since the increased use of plastics and aluminum this is no longer common. There are two allotropic forms of tin, depending on the temperature. A variety of tin alloys morphologies exist including the following metals: soft solder, fusible, pewter, bronze, Babbit, White, and phosphor bronze metal. Tin oxide metals are corrosive resistant which is important in industrial uses.

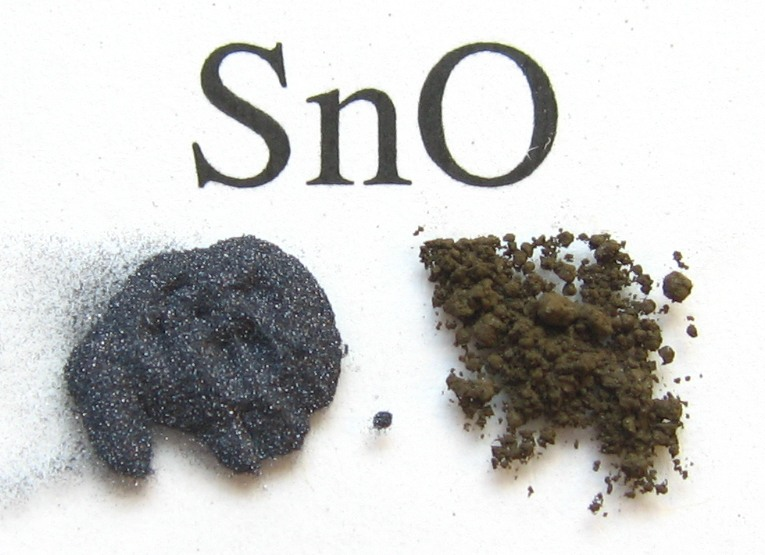
Tin(II) oxide, or Stannous oxide, is a brown-black powder or blue-black crystalline solid compound.

=== Industrial applications of Tin oxides ===
==== Stannous oxide (SnO) ====
Stannous oxide (SnO) is used for manufacturing glass materials, like ceramics. The compound is insoluble in water and takes the form of a brow-black powder or blue-black crystalline solid. It is labeled as both an irritant and health hazard in the chemical safety sections of safety data sheets.

==== Stannic oxide (SnO_{2}) ====
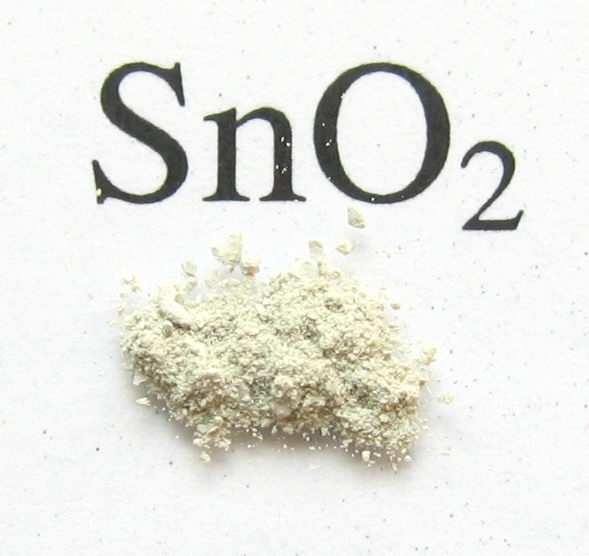
Tin(iv) oxide, or stannic oxide, is an off-white/ white crystalline solid powder compound.

The primary uses for stannic oxide (SnO_{2}) include polishing glass, marble, silver, and jewelry in addition to creating dyes for fabrics, paper, ceramic glazes, printing inks, coatings, and pigments in food polymers. Stannic oxide is also insoluble in water and dissociates in sulfuric acids and hydrochloric acid.

== Case studies ==
=== De-tinning plant ===
In 1979, a 26 year old tin miner who worked in a smelter was found to have odd lung physiology after a radiography. He was asymptomatic despite having profuse small, metallic nodules in the lungs. At the same plant, a 55 year old man who loaded scrap tin into smelting furnaces for 15 years was assessed. His radiography confirmed that his cough and crackle was due to metallic bilateral nodules on the lungs, or stannosis. The second male's biopsy revealed macrophages overwhelmed with dust deposits that affected hist connective tissue in the lungs. The case study determined that two workers in a detinning mine, who handled molten tin, developed stannosis. According to the researchers of "Stannosis: A report of 2 cases", the two workers were subject to the dustiest job of packaging tin-oxide for transportation. Tin miners are typically researched when assessing for stannosis because their exposure to tin oxides is around 70-80% in comparison to other job tasks in a plant.

=== Tinning milk reservoir tanks ===
After 17 years of painting tin hot tin powder into the inside of tanks, a 74 year old male patient developed a dry cough and progressive dyspnea. Because engineering controls and respiratory personal protective equipment were not used, the worker suffered grave lung damage. In comparison to healthy, non-tinning workers, the patient had significantly higher bronchoalveolar lavage fluid (BLAF) containing tin.
