= Byssinosis =

- Other names: Brown lung disease, Monday fever
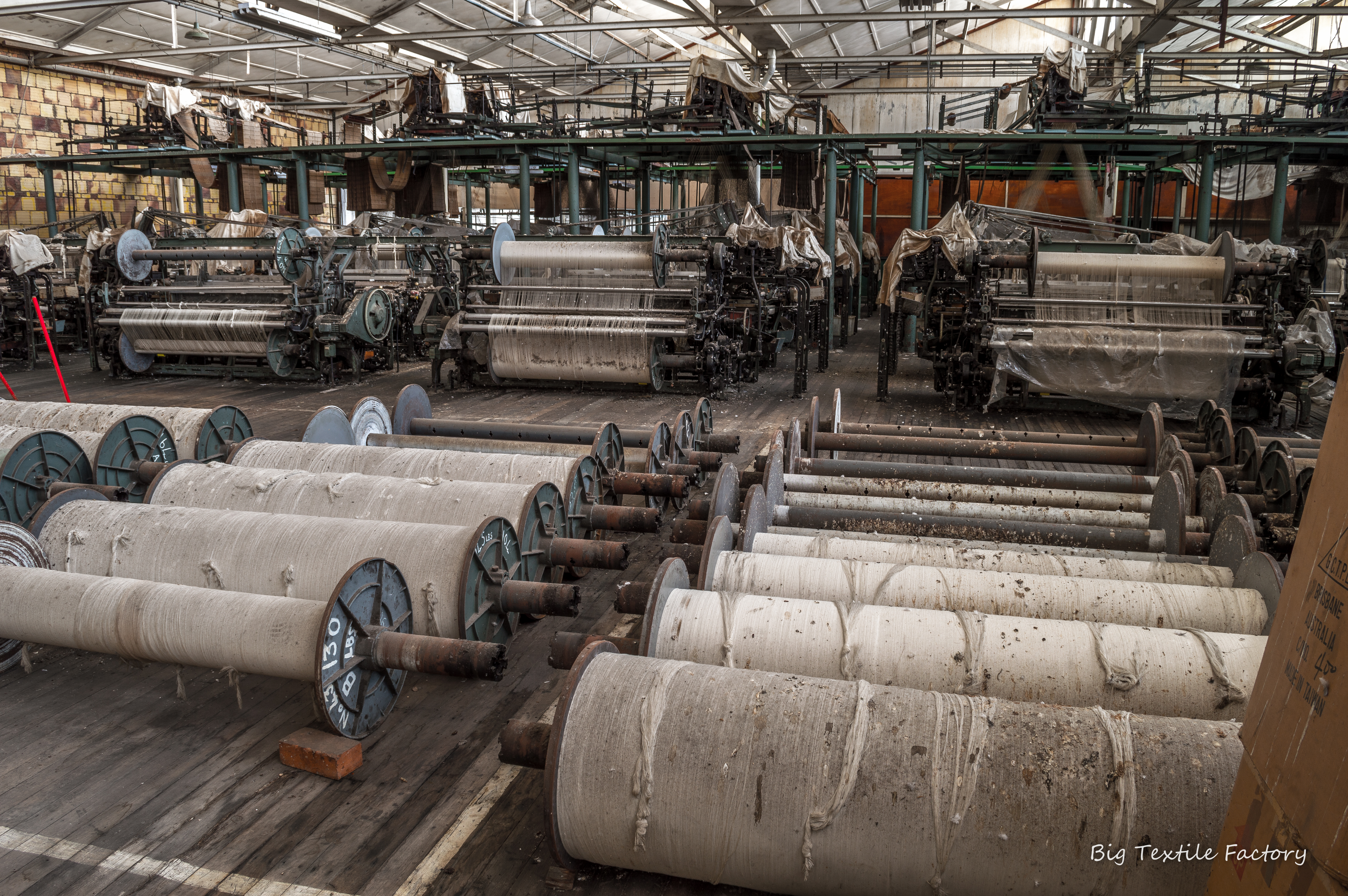
- A mill where fibrous material, such as cotton, is processed from machinery.
- Specialty: Pulmonology

Byssinosis (Note: From the Greek βύσσινον byssinon, from βύσσος byssos, "flax, the linen made therefrom, later Indian cotton, silk" and the medical suffix -osis (< -ωσις).) is an occupational lung disease caused by inhalation of cotton or jute dust in inadequately ventilated working environments and can develop over time with repeated exposure. Byssinosis commonly occurs in textile workers who are employed in yarn and fabric manufacture industries. It is now thought that the cotton dust directly causes the disease and some believe that the causative agents are endotoxins that come from the cell walls of gram-negative bacteria that grow on the cotton. Although bacterial endotoxin is a likely cause, the absence of similar symptoms in workers in other industries exposed to endotoxins makes this uncertain. Current smokers are also at risk for developing byssinosis or having complications relating to byssinosis.

Of the 81 byssinosis-related fatalities reported in the United States between 1990 and 1999, 48% included an occupation in the yarn, thread, and fabric industry on their death certificate. This disease often occurred in the times of the Industrial Revolution. Most commonly young girls working in mills or other textile factories would be affected by this disease. In the United States, from 1996 to 2005, North Carolina accounted for about 37% of all deaths caused by byssinosis, with 31, followed by South Carolina (8) and Georgia (7).

There is a lack of information regarding the prevalence and impact of byssinosis in low and middle income countries (LMIC) despite the fact that of the 25 million tons of cotton produced worldwide, about two thirds of this production comes from LMICs like India, Pakistan, and China. Many textile mills and fiber producing factories located in LMICs have high rates of chronic respiratory disease caused by byssinosis.

The term "brown lung" is a misnomer, as the lungs of affected individuals are not brown. Byssinosis is also referred to as cotton worker's lung, mill fever, brown lung disease, and Monday fever.

In 1981, the Charlotte Observer won the Pulitzer Prize for Public Service by addressing the systematic neglect in North Carolina's textile industries regarding byssinosis complaints.

== History ==
In 1971, the Occupational Safety and Health Administration (OSHA) set a permissible exposure limit (PEL) of 1-mg/m^{3} (total dust) for cotton dust in work places. Later in the 1978 OSHA developed the Cotton Dust Standard which aimed to prevent occupational respiratory disease, such as byssinosis, through medical monitoring of employees. The PEL of cotton dust was set to 0.2 mg/m^{3} of airborne dust. This was considered the lowest level that could be measured by the vertical elutriator cotton dust sampler.

OSHA regulators hoped that the Cotton Dust Standard Act would help decrease the impact of dust exposure of employees and reduce occupational respiratory diseases. However, a NISOH sponsored committee remained apprehensive about this standard as an earlier study conducted by NIOSH found that byssinosis diagnoses were brought on by cotton dust levels as low as 0.1 mg/m^{3} meaning that there is still a risk for the development of byssinosis for cotton dust exposure under the PEL. Today, NIOSH has set a recommended exposure limit (REL) of cotton dust to less than 0.2 mg/m^{3} for up to a 10-hour workday.

== Symptoms ==
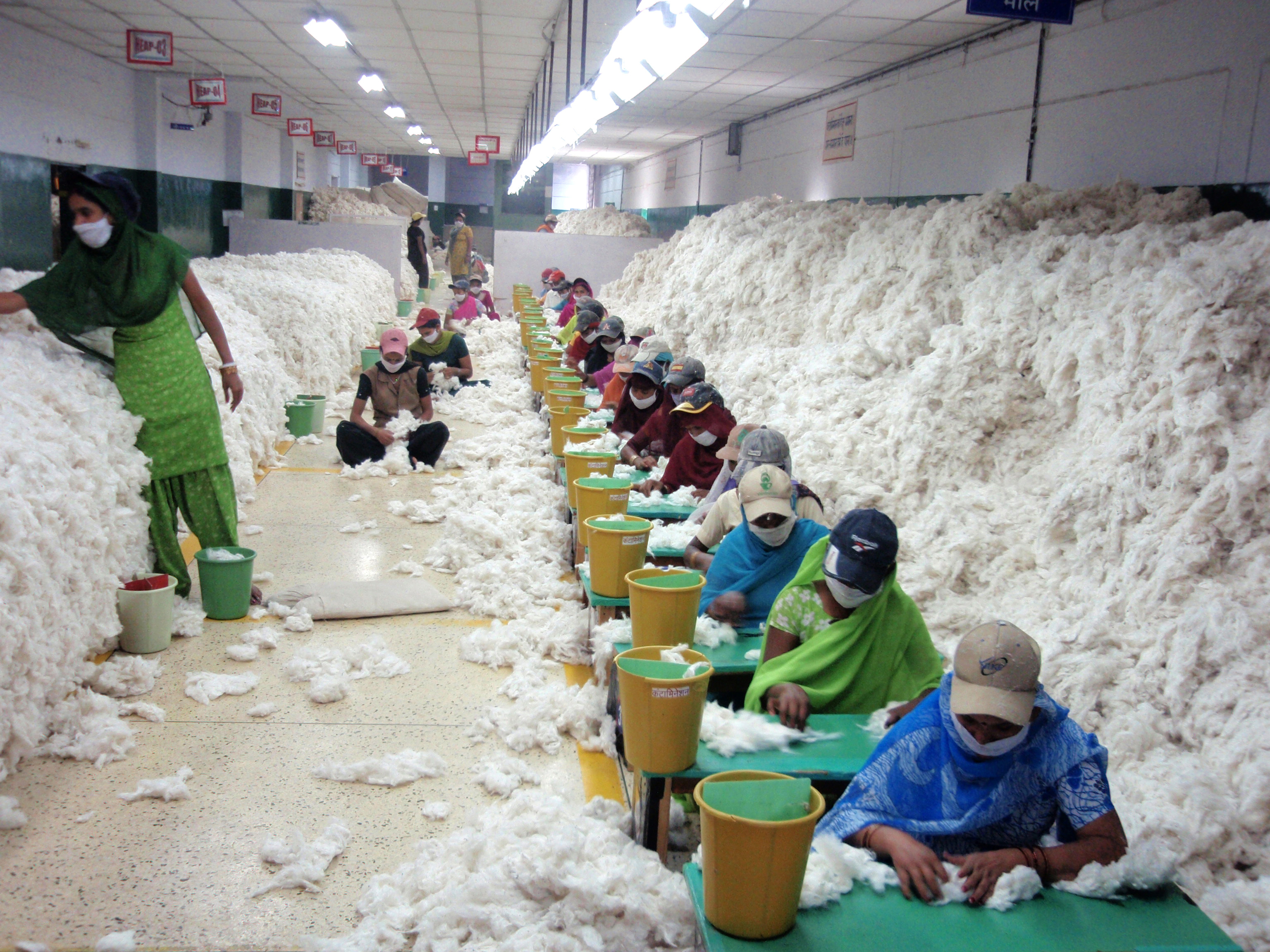
Employees at an Indian spinning mill working with unprocessed cotton, potentially exposing themselves to cotton dust and particles.

Symptoms of byssinosis can include:

- Cough with sputum
- Dyspnea
- Breathing difficulties
- Chest tightness
- Wheezing
- Cough

Patients can develop these symptoms after a few hours of exposure at minimum. For this reason, patients who develop and report these symptoms, and subsequently byssinosis, are one of the reasons why the term Monday Fever exists. Byssinosis can become chronic in patients who are continually exposed to cotton, jute, or yarn dust over time. Chronic byssinosis can ultimately result in narrowing of the airways, lung scarring and death from infection or respiratory failure. Extended exposure to cotton or jute dust can lead to impaired lung function and further respiratory complications. Patients may require oxygen to assist with breathing and may also have difficulty exercising. It can be misdiagnosed as COPD or asthma.

== Diagnosis ==
There is currently no official form of diagnosing an individual with byssinosis. It can be difficult to accurately diagnose a patient with byssinosis due to symptoms that are similar to other respiratory diseases such as chronic obstructive pulmonary diseases (COPD), asthma, or bronchitis. Byssinosis can be misdiagnosed as other pneumoconioses therefore a chest x-ray and/or lung function test is needed to accurately diagnose a patient who may have byssinosis. The main distinction of byssinosis from other respiratory diseases comes from the initial exposure. Patients who have byssinosis have typically been exposed to cotton or just dust for an extended period of time and experience symptoms of chest tightness and coughing.

Patient history should reveal exposure to cotton, flax, hemp, or jute dust. Measurable change in lung function before and after working shifts is key to diagnosis. Patients with byssinosis show a significant drop in FEV1 over the course of work shift. Chest radiographs show areas of opacity due to fibrosis of the pulmonary parenchyma.

Another form of diagnosis is observing patient symptoms throughout their work shift. Patients with byssinosis due to dust inhalation will experience adverse symptoms when they begin their work shift on Monday which is where the term Monday Fever comes in.

== Treatment ==
Affected workers should be offered alternative employment. Employers in the manufacturing and textile industry should take preventative measures to ensure workers are not exposed to excessive dust and cotton during their work shifts as this is the main cause of byssinosis exposure. Continued exposure leads to development of persistent symptoms and progressive decline in FEV1. Dust control measures can also help reduce the risk of textile workers developing byssinosis.

Educational content aimed to raise awareness about byssinosis and other occupational lung diseases can be useful to inform workers and managers in textile industry as well as unions, and other health professionals. Educational content should be based on signs and symptoms of byssinosis as well as other diagnostic measures.

== See also ==
- Cotton production in the United States
- Textile manufacturing
- Respiratory disease
