= Progressive massive fibrosis =

Medical condition of the lungs

Progressive massive fibrosis (PMF), characterized by the development of large conglomerate masses of dense fibrosis (usually in the upper lung zones), can complicate silicosis and coal worker's pneumoconiosis. Conglomerate masses may also occur in other pneumoconioses, such as talcosis, berylliosis (CBD), kaolin pneumoconiosis, and pneumoconiosis from carbon compounds, such as carbon black, graphite, and oil shale. Conglomerate masses can also develop in sarcoidosis, but usually near the hilae and with surrounding paracicatricial emphysema.

The disease arises firstly through the deposition of silica or coal dust (or other dust) within the lung, and then through the body's immunological reactions to the dust.

== Presentation ==
According to the International Labour Office (ILO), PMF requires the presence of large opacity exceeding 1 cm (by x-ray). By pathology standards, the lesion in histologic section must exceed 2 cm to meet the definition of PMF. In PMF, lesions most commonly occupy the upper lung zone, and are usually bilateral. The development of PMF is usually associated with a restrictive ventilatory defect on pulmonary function testing. PMF can be mistaken for bronchogenic carcinoma and vice versa. PMF lesions tend to grow very slowly, so any rapid changes in size, or development of cavitation, should prompt a search for either alternative cause or secondary disease.

== Pathogenesis ==
The pathogenesis of PMF is complicated, but involves two main routes – an immunological route, and a mechanical route.

Immunologically, disease is caused primarily through the activity of lung macrophages, which phagocytose dust particles after their deposition. These macrophages seek to eliminate the dust particle through either the mucociliary mechanism, or through lymphatic vessels which drain the lungs. Macrophages also produce an inflammatory mediator known as interleukin-1 (IL-1), which is part of the immune systems first line defenses against infecting particles. IL-1 is responsible for 'activation' of local vasculature, causing endothelial cells to express certain cell adhesion molecules, which help the cells of the body's immune system to migrate into tissues. Macrophages exposed to dust have been shown to have markedly decreased chemotaxis. Production of inflammatory mediators – and the tissue damage that ensues as an effect of this, as well as reduced motility of cells, is fundamental to the pathogenesis of pneumoconiosis and the accompanying inflammation, fibrosis, and emphysema.

There are also some mechanical factors involved in the pathogenesis of Complex Pneumoconiosis that should be considered. The most notable indications are the fact that the disease tends to develop in the upper lobe of the lung – especially on the right, and its common occurrence in taller individuals.

== Incidence ==
Progressive massive fibrosis increased during the period 1970–2016 among coal miners in central Appalachia who filed for black lung benefits.
