= Flock worker's lung =

Occupational disease

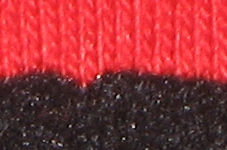
- Flocked fabric
- Specialty: Pulmonology

Flock worker's lung is an occupational lung disease caused by exposure to flock, small fibers that are glued to a backing in order to create a specific texture. People who work in flocking are at risk of inhaling small pieces of the flock fibers, which causes interstitial lung disease. The disease was initially described in 1998, when a group of workers at a flocking plant developed interstitial lung disease of unknown cause.

== Signs and symptoms ==
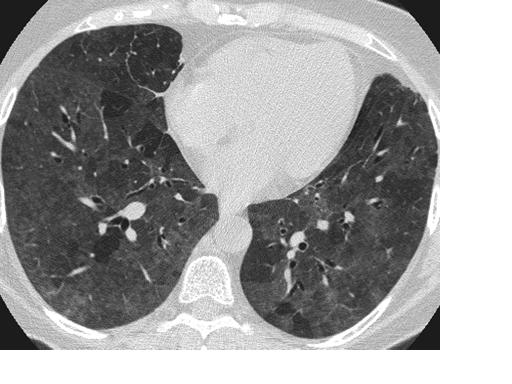
Ground-glass opacity seen on CT caused by hypersensitivity pneumonitis, not flock worker's lung. This type of abnormality is commonly seen in flock worker's lung.

Signs and symptoms of flock worker's lung include rales (crackling noises caused by fluid in the lungs), dyspnea (shortness of breath), and coughing. Abnormalities seen on a computed tomography (CT) scan of the lungs can include ground glass opacity and reticular opacity. The typical histopathology in flock worker's lung is bronchiolocentric interstitial pneumonitis and lymphocytic bronchiolitis with lymphocytic hyperplasia. Occasionally, desquamative interstitial pneumonia and bronchiolitis obliterans organizing pneumonia can be seen.

Other symptoms described in flock workers include pleuritic chest pain and atypical chest pain. Most cases described have been chronic and progressive. Lung function in individuals with flock worker's lung is generally diminished, with both restrictive and obstructive defects found.

== Causes ==
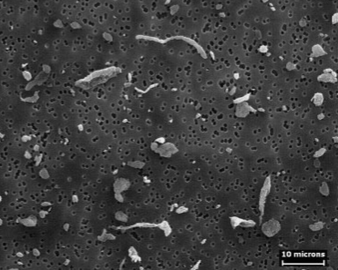
Scanning electron microscope image of airborne respirable dust sample collected in test chamber after agitating a bulk flock sample from a card manufacturing plant

Flock worker's lung is caused by exposure to small pieces of flock, usually nylon, created during the flocking process and inhaled. Exposure to rotary-cut flock particulates is the main risk factor; whether or not other types of flock cause this pulmonary fibrosis is not yet determined. Other types of flock include rayon, polypropylene, and polyethylene. Workers exposed to nylon, polypropylene, polyethylene, and rayon flocking debris have developed flock worker's lung. Exposure to higher concentrations of respirable flock particles is associated with more severe disease.

Whether or not smoking affects the progression or incidence of flock worker's lung is a topic of ongoing research as of 2015. Research in rats has shown that nylon flocking is a causative agent.

== Diagnosis ==
A CT scan of the lungs and histopathology along with a history of working in the flocking industry can diagnose flock worker's lung. A differential diagnosis may also include Sjögren's syndrome and lymphoid interstitial pneumonia. Flock worker's lung may be misdiagnosed as asthma or recurrent pneumonia. Though X-rays may be abnormal, CT scans are more useful as a diagnostic tool in flock worker's lung. Other diagnostic methods may include a transbronchial biopsy or wedge biopsy.

== Prevention ==
Flock worker's lung can be prevented with engineering controls that protect workers from inhaling flock. Engineering controls to prevent inhalation of flock can include using guillotine cutters rather than rotary cutters, and ensuring that blades are sharp, since dull blades shear off more respirable particles. NIOSH-certified respirators can be worn to reduce the risk of inhalation when performing certain activities. Flocking plants have also implemented medical surveillance programs for workers to diagnose cases at an earlier stage. Another technique for preventing flock worker's lung is cleaning the workplace with alternatives to compressed air in order to avoid resuspending particulates in the air.

== Treatment ==
Flock worker's lung is generally treated by removing the individual from the environment where they are inhaling flock. Symptoms generally improve within days to weeks after stopping exposure. The benefits of glucocorticoid therapy are unclear.

== Prognosis ==
Flock worker's lung may raise the risk for lung cancer, but the connection is a topic of research as of 2015. The disease can be subacute or develop over long periods of exposure.

== Epidemiology ==
Cases have been reported in the United States, Canada, Turkey, and Spain.

== History ==
Interstitial lung disease in flock workers was first connected to flock fibers in 1991, though the disease now known as "flock worker's lung" was not formally described until 1998, when researchers from NIOSH published the results of an epidemiological investigation of outbreaks in Ontario and Rhode Island. Previously, interstitial lung disease in flock workers was incorrectly attributed to mycotoxins present in contaminated adhesive. As of June 1999, 24 flock workers had been diagnosed.
