= Black lung disease =

Human disease caused by long-term exposure to coal dust

- Other names: Coal workers' pneumoconiosis, anthracosis, black lung, coal mine dust lung disease
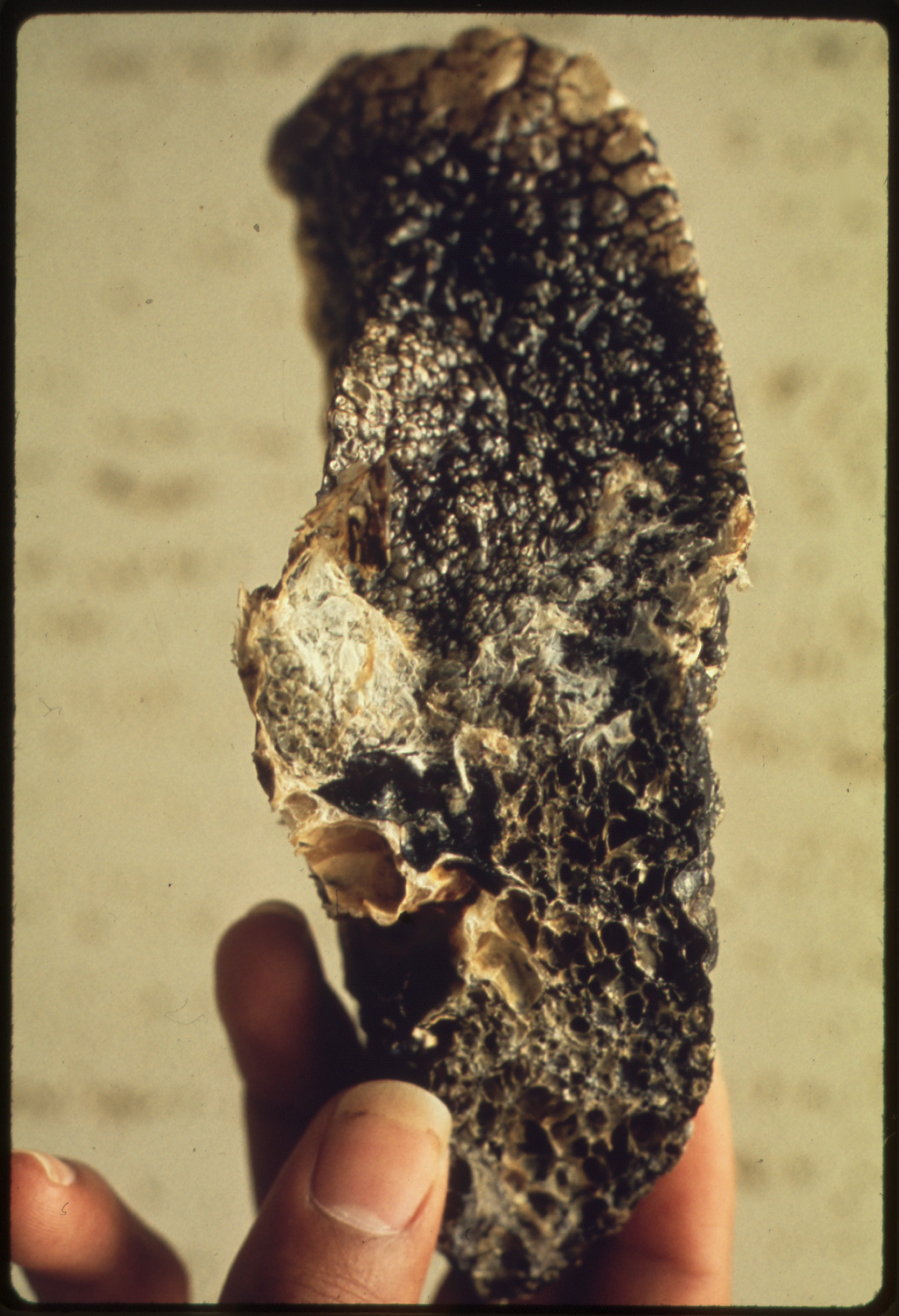
- Lung affected by black lung disease
- Specialty: Pulmonology
- Complications: Chronic obstructive pulmonary disease
- Types: Anthracosis; Simple coal workers’ pneumoconiosis; Progressive massive fibrosis
- Causes: Prolonged exposure to coal dust
- Deaths: 25,000 in 2013

Black lung disease (BLD), also known as coal workers' pneumoconiosis, coal miner’s lung, or simply black lung, is an occupational type of pneumoconiosis caused by long-term inhalation and deposition of coal dust in the lungs and the lung tissue's consequent reaction to its presence. It is common in coal miners and others who work with coal. It is similar to both silicosis from inhaling silica dust and asbestosis from inhaling asbestos dust. Inhaled coal dust progressively builds up in the lungs and leads to inflammation, fibrosis, and in worse cases, necrosis.

Black lung disease develops after the initial, milder form of the disease known as anthracosis (from the Greek ἄνθραξ, or ánthrax – coal, carbon). This is often asymptomatic and is found to at least some extent in all urban dwellers due to air pollution. Prolonged exposure to large amounts of coal dust can result in more serious forms of the disease, simple coal workers' pneumoconiosis and complicated coal workers' pneumoconiosis (or progressive massive fibrosis, PMF). More commonly, workers exposed to coal dust develop industrial bronchitis, clinically defined as chronic bronchitis (i.e. a productive cough for three months per year for at least two years) associated with workplace dust exposure. The incidence of industrial bronchitis varies with age, job, exposure, and smoking. In non-smokers (who are less prone to develop bronchitis than smokers), studies of coal miners have shown a 16% to 17% incidence of industrial bronchitis.

In 2013, BLD resulted in 25,000 deaths globally—down from 29,000 deaths in 1990. In the US, a 2018 study by the National Institute of Occupational Safety and Health shows a resurgence among veteran coalminers, recording the highest rate of BLD in roughly two decades.

== Pathogenesis ==
Coal dust is not as fibrogenic as silica dust. Most coal dust that enters healthy lungs is removed by mucociliary clearance and the cough reflex. Coal dust that is not removed by these mechanisms can neither be destroyed nor removed by the body. The particles are engulfed by resident alveolar macrophages or interstitial macrophages and remain in the lungs, residing in the connective tissue or pulmonary lymph nodes. Coal dust provides a sufficient stimulus for the macrophage to release various products, including enzymes, cytokines, oxygen radicals, and fibroblast growth factors, which are important in the development of inflammation and fibrosis in BLD. Aggregations of carbon-laden macrophages can be visualized under a microscope as granular, black areas. In serious cases, the lung may grossly appear black. These aggregations can cause inflammation and fibrosis, as well as the formation of nodular lesions within the lungs. The centers of dense lesions may become necrotic due to ischemia, leading to large cavities within the lung.

=== Appearance ===
Simple BLD is marked by the presence of 1–2 mm (0.039–0.079 in) nodular aggregations of anthracotic macrophages, supported by a fine collagen network, within the lungs. Those 1–2 mm in diameter are known as coal macules, with larger aggregations known as coal nodules. These structures occur most frequently around the initial site of coal dust accumulation—the upper regions of the lungs around respiratory bronchioles. The coal macule is the basic pathological feature of BLD and has a surrounding area of enlargement of the airspace, known as focal emphysema. Focal emphysema extends into progressive centrilobular emphysema. Less commonly a variant of panacinar emphysema develops.

Continued exposure to coal dust following the development of simple BLD may progress to complicated BLD with progressive massive fibrosis (PMF), wherein large masses of dense fibrosis develop, usually in the upper lung zones, measuring greater than 1 cm (0.39 in) in diameter, with accompanying decreased lung function. These cases generally require a number of years to develop. Grossly, the lung itself appears blackened. Pathologically, these consist of fibrosis with haphazardly-arranged collagen and many pigment-laden macrophages and abundant free pigment. Radiographically, BLD can appear strikingly similar to silicosis. In simple BLD, small rounded nodules predominate, tending to first appear in the upper lung zones. The nodules may coalesce and form large opacities (>1 cm), characterizing complicated BLD, or PMF.

== Diagnosis ==
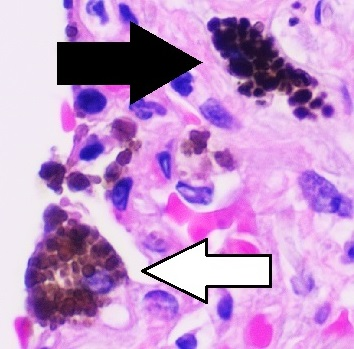
Micrograph of anthracosis, with interstitial pigment deposition (black arrow) and an anthracotic macrophage (white arrow)

There are three basic criteria for the diagnosis of BLD:

1. Chest radiography consistent with BLD
2. An exposure history to coal dust (typically underground coal mining) of sufficient amount and latency
3. Exclusion of alternative diagnoses (mimics of BLD)

Symptoms and pulmonary function testing relate to the degree of respiratory impairment but are not part of the diagnostic criteria. As noted above, the chest X-ray appearance for BLD can be virtually indistinguishable from silicosis. Chest CT, particularly high-resolution scanning (HRCT), are more sensitive than plain X-ray for detecting the small round opacities.

=== Treatment ===
There is no cure or discovered treatments for pneumoconiosis. The treatments that are available only relieve the symptoms but do not reverse or stop the illness. Some patients are given supplemental oxygen to help with their breathing and are advised to stop smoking to prevent further decline in lung function. In the most extreme cases, a lung transplant could be done to help prolong the patient's life expectancy.

=== Prevention of pneumoconiosis ===
The main way to avoid contracting coal worker's pneumoconiosis is to avoid the inhalation of coal dust. Some of the ways to prevent this disease include: wearing ventilated masks, such as NIOSH-certified respirators, when coming in contact with potentially dangerous airborne particles; regular pulmonary exams; and becoming educated about the risks of lung diseases in your work environment. Pneumoconiosis can also be caused by inhaling other dusts, including aluminum, antimony, barium, graphite, iron, kaolin, mica, and talc.

== Epidemiology ==
A video from 2008 on the history of black lung disease

In 2013, BLD resulted in 25,000 deaths; down from 29,000 deaths in 1990. Between 1970 and 1974, prevalence of BLD among U.S. coal miners who had worked over 25 years was 32%; the same group saw a prevalence of 9% in 2005–2006.

In Australia, BLD was considered to be eliminated in the 1970s due to strict hazard control measures. However, there has been a resurgence of BLD in Australia, with the first new cases being detected in May 2015. From 1999 to 2016, the average years of life lost due to BLD increased from 8.1 to 12.6 years, most likely due to the increased severity and progression of BLD.

== History ==
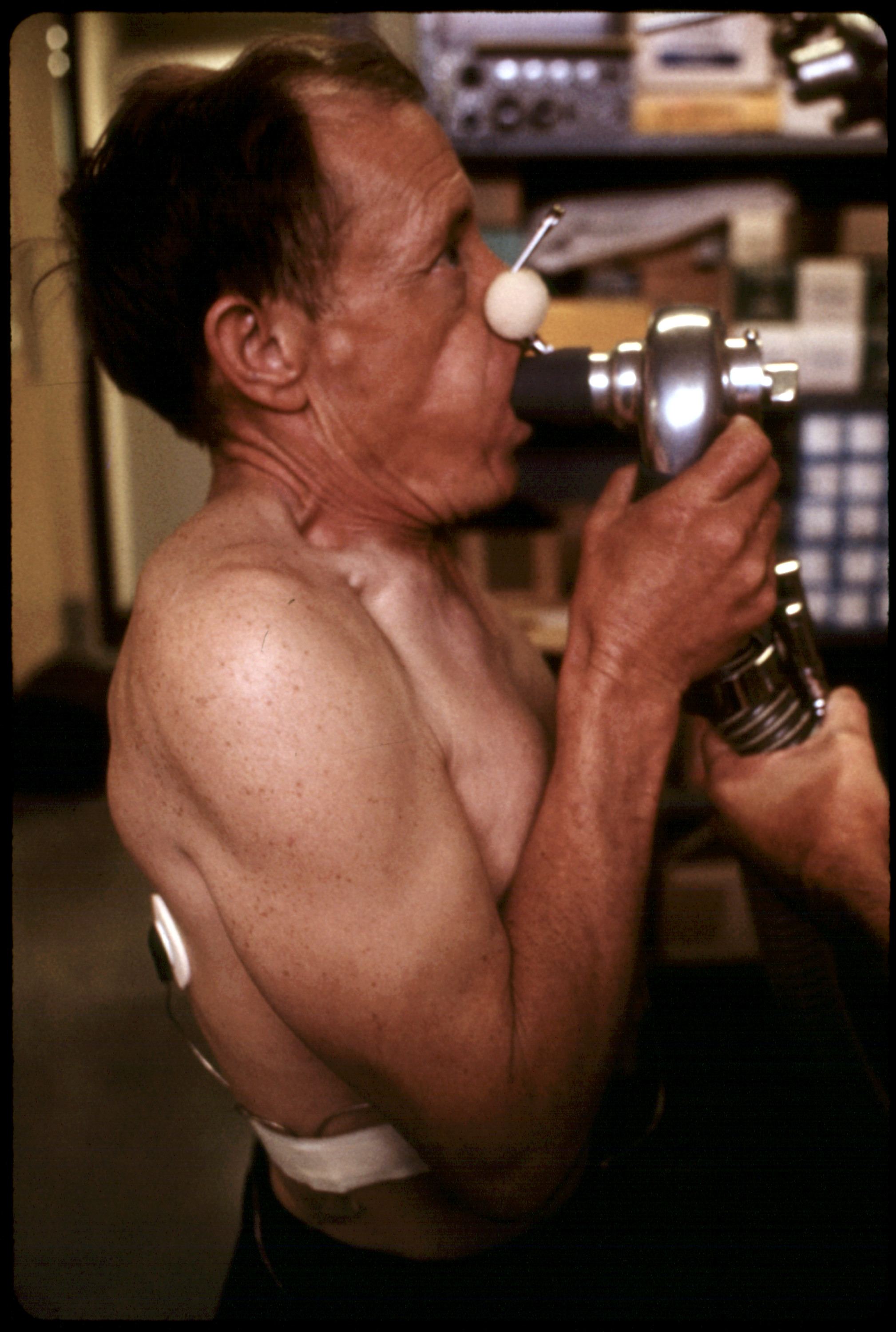
A miner at the Black Lung Laboratory in the Appalachian Regional Hospital in Beckley, West Virginia in 1970

"Black lung" originally described a variety of conditions. It was not until the 1950s that its dangers were well-understood. Over time this disease had taken a large toll on the mining industry and the workers involved. The prevailing view was that silicosis was very serious but it was solely caused by silica and not coal dust. The miners' union, the United Mine Workers of America, realized that rapid mechanization meant drills that produced much more dust, but under John L. Lewis they decided not to raise the black lung issue because it might impede the mechanization that was producing higher productivity and higher wages. Union priorities were to maintain the viability of the long-fought-for welfare and retirement fund, which would be sustained by higher outputs of coal. After the death of Lewis, the union dropped its opposition to calling black lung a disease and realized the financial advantages of a fund for its disabled members.

In the Federal Coal Mine Health and Safety Act of 1969, the US Congress set up standards to reduce dust and created the Black Lung Disability Trust. The mining companies agreed to a clause, by which a ten-year history of mine work, coupled with X-ray or autopsy evidence of severe lung damage, guaranteed compensation. Equally important was a "rate retention" clause that allowed workers with progressive lung disease to transfer to jobs with lower exposure without loss of pay, seniority, or benefits. Financed by a federal tax on coal, the Trust by 2009 had distributed over $44 billion in benefits to miners disabled by the disease and their widows. A miner who has spent 25 years in underground coal mines has a 5–10% risk of contracting the disease.

=== 21st century ===
After the Federal Coal Mine Health and Safety Act of 1969 became law in the United States, the percentage of American miners with black lung disease decreased by about 90 percent. More recently, however, rates of the disease have been on the rise. The National Institute for Occupational Safety and Health (NIOSH) reported that close to 9 percent of miners with 25 years or more experience tested positive for black lung in 2005–2006, compared with four percent in the late 1990s.

New findings have shown that BLD can be a risk for surface coal miners, who are 48% of the workforce. Data from the Coal Workers' Health Surveillance Program of NIOSH, which examined chest X-rays from more than 2,000 miners in 16 US states from 2010 to 2011, showed that 2% of miners with greater than one year of surface mining experience developed BLD. 0.5% of these miners had PMF. Most of these workers had never worked in an underground mine prior to surface mining. A high proportion of the X-rays suggested that these miners had developed silicosis.

NIOSH, with support from the Mine Safety and Health Administration (MSHA), operates a Mobile Health Screening Program, which travels to mining regions around the United States. Miners who participate in the Program receive health evaluations once every five years, at no cost to themselves. Chest x-rays can detect the early signs of and changes in BLD, often before the miner is aware of any lung problems.

A 2016–17 investigation by National Public Radio found that NIOSH had under-reported cases of PMF (a complication of black lung) by at least a factor of 20. NPR identified over 2,000 cases at certain clinics in Kentucky, Virginia, West Virginia, Pennsylvania, and Ohio, compared to 99 that NIOSH reported. NIOSH confirmed in 2018 the largest cluster of PMF ever scientifically documented, despite near-elimination of the disease in the 1990s. The causes of the spike are believed to include longer working shifts, mining of thinner coal seams (which causes mining machines to put more non-coal silica dust in the air), and retirements and layoffs that have prompted more former employees to visit health clinics.

New U.S. MSHA rules took effect in August 2016 that lowered maximum allowed dust concentrations for surface and underground mines, and exposure by miners who have been found to be developing pneumoconiosis.

== Research ==
Work to investigate the relationship between respirable dust exposure and coal worker's pneumoconiosis was carried out in the United Kingdom by the Institute of Occupational Medicine. This research was known as the Pneumoconiosis Field Research (PFR). The research underpinned the recommendations for more stringent airborne dust standards in British coalmines and the PFR was ultimately used as the basis for many national dust standards around the world.

In October 2023 Summit Consulting LLC did research for the US Department of Labor about incidents of black lung disease. The point of their research was to answer some key questions that would shed some light on the prevalence and danger of black lung disease in specific subpopulations. The sub populations researched included miners, mining communities, the Navajo Nation, and Appalachia residents. The data sets that Summit used were compiled from the US Census Bureau American Community Survey, US Energy Information Administration, US Census Bureau County Business Patters, the CDC, online data for Epidemiologic Research, Coal Workers Health and Surveillance programs, and the MSHA Mines Data Set. These statistics were used to determine if the increasing number of cases can be abated, and to design predictions for future numbers of the disease.

The report's first finding was the rate of black lung disease across the United States, with an average of 4.34 cases and 3.44 deaths per county. In certain areas of the country, these numbers go up dramatically. In Appalachia it was discovered that there were 28.79 cases and 10.88 deaths per county due to the larger mining populations in the Appalachia region. There were 103 counties in America that reported the disease during the entire data acquisition process which lasted from 1970 to 2014. However, 333 counties reported deaths from black lung disease during this time, indicating that where people worked and developed the disease may not match where people seek treatment or die afterwards. The research also led to the discovery that since 1990s, CWP (Coal Worker's Pneumoconiosis) has been increasing. The numbers collected may even be undercounted, as the Coal Workers Health Surveillance Programs had a low output of screenings, and compensation approval rates were very slow. Despite these issues, the amount of cases are still increasing. A study released in May 2018 showed that 4,600 coal miners developed the worst kind of the disease with over half of these cases happening since 2000.

The report's second finding involved a comparison of black lung disease rates in mining communities, former mining communities, and non-mining communities. The results indicate black lung disease rates are highest in current mining communities and significantly lower in former mining communities. Non-mining communities reported low rates of black lung disease cases or deaths.

A third finding of the study compared rates of black lung disease in the Navajo nation to the residents of Appalachia and the rest of the country. While the residents of Appalachia suffered much higher rates of the disease and deaths from the disease compared to other areas of the country, the Navajo nation didn't report major differences compared to the rest of the country with just ten deaths being reported over the course of the collection period from 1970 to 2020. This may be due to underreporting in the Navajo nation.

The last finding of the study was to determine the correlation of residential coal burning and instances of black lung disease. In comparison to the rest of the U.S. outside Appalachia, an increase of cases and deaths was found in residential areas where coal is burned. Residential coal burning may be a contributing factor and not the main cause though, as these areas also have more mines and miners that could develop the disease from their occupation.

There is ongoing research and data is being collected across the U.S.

== See also ==
- Black Lung Benefits Act of 1972
- Caplan syndrome

== Prevention and occupational safety ==
Black lung disease is considered a preventable occupational illness, and most prevention efforts focus on reducing long-term exposure to respirable coal mine dust in mining environments. One of the main ways to prevent the disease is through engineering controls that limit how much dust is in the air. These controls include water sprays, proper ventilation systems, and dust suppression technologies that help lower the concentration of coal dust. Ventilation is especially important because it helps move contaminated air out and bring in cleaner air, reducing how much dust workers breathe in over time. Monitoring dust levels is also important because it allows unsafe conditions to be identified early and corrected before exposure becomes too high.

Personal protective equipment (PPE) is another way to reduce exposure. Respirators and protective masks are used to filter dust before it enters the lungs. However, PPE is more effective when combined with engineering controls rather than used alone, since it depends on proper use and consistency. Due to this, training workers on how to use protective equipment and recognize hazards is an important part of prevention.

Regulations also play a major factor in reducing cases of black lung disease. In the United States, agencies like MSHA and NIOSH set exposure limits and enforce safety standards. These rules require regular monitoring of dust levels and corrective action when limits are exceeded.

Health surveillance programs are also important. The Coal Workers Health Surveillance Program provides screenings like chest x-rays and lung function tests to detect early signs of the disease. Early detection helps reduce further exposure and may slow disease progression.

Even with these prevention efforts, black lung disease is still being reported today; especially among long-term miners. This suggests that safety measures are not always fully enforced or followed, and continued improvements are needed.
