= Bauxite fibrosis =

- Other names: Shaver's disease, Corundum smelter's lung, Bauxite lung or Bauxite smelters' disease, Bauxite pneumoconiosis
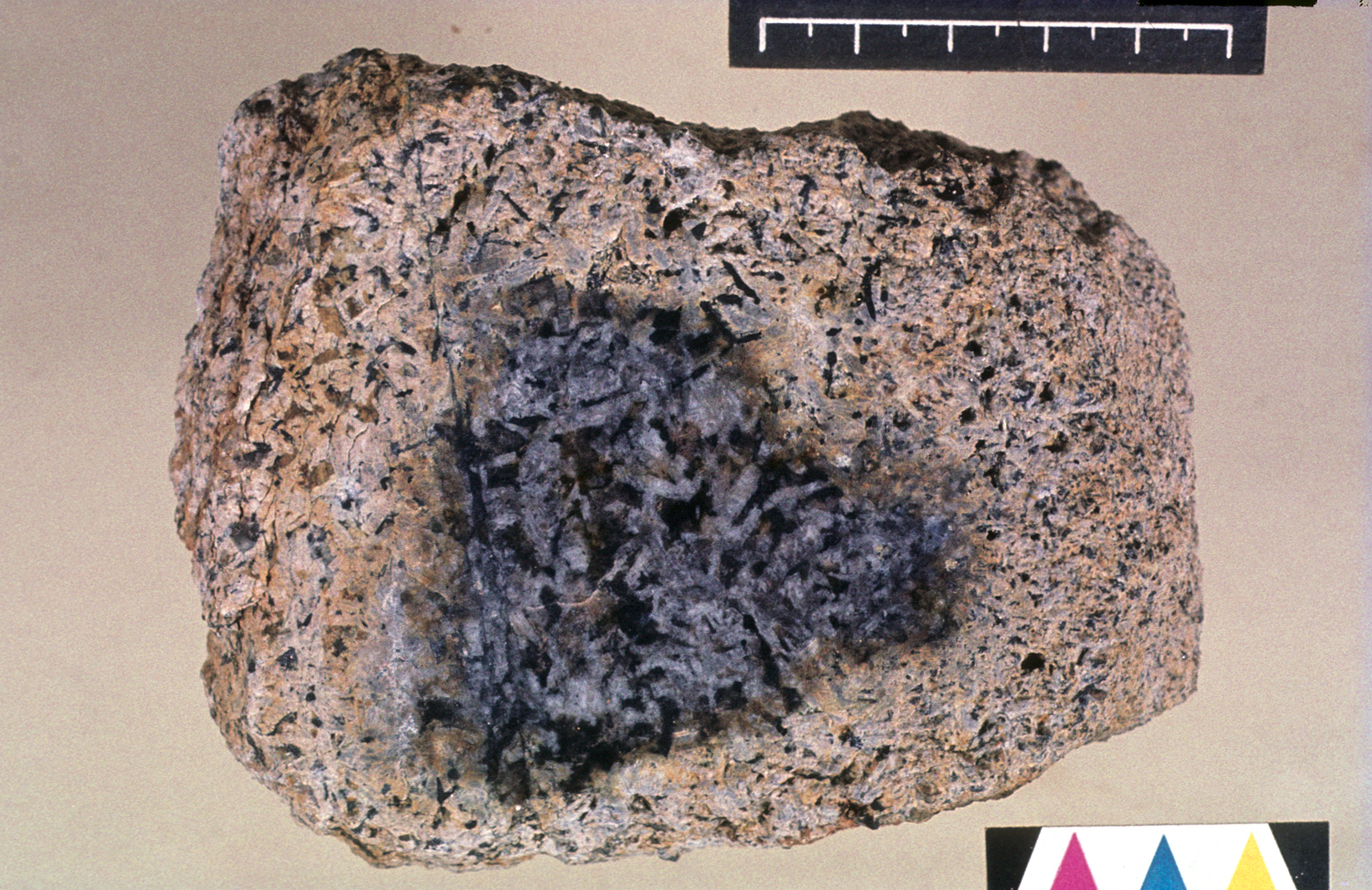
- Bauxite with unweathered rock core
- Specialty: Pulmonology

Bauxite fibrosis is a progressive form of pneumoconiosis usually caused by occupational exposure to bauxite fumes which contain aluminium and silica particulates.

It is typically seen in workers involved in the smelting of bauxite to produce corundum.

== Presentation ==
Initially, the disease appears as alveolitis, and then progresses to emphysema.

Patients may develop pneumothorax (collapsed lung).

== Diagnosis ==
Diagnosis depends on chest X-rays, lung function tests, and history.
