= Chalicosis =

- Other names: Flint disease
- Specialty: Respirology

Chalicosis is a form of pneumoconiosis affecting the lungs or bronchioles, found mainly among stonecutters. The disease is caused by the inhalation of fine particles of stone. The term is from Greek, χάλιξ, gravel.

== Risk factors ==
Occupations with significant exposure to stone dust are at an increased risk of chalicosis include:

- Millers
- Miners
- Stone cutters and stone masons
- Quarry workers
- Pottery and porcelain casters
- Tunneller/tunnel workers
- Foundry workers
- Plasterers
- Carpenters

== Signs and symptoms ==
Signs and symptoms of chalicosis are slow to develop and thus patients may not show signs of incapacity until years after exposure. It may even take up to 10 years before manifestations of the disorder are present. Signs and symptoms include:

- Dyspnea (uncomfortable breathing sensation/shortness of breath) aggravated by exertion
- Chronic, non-productive cough
- Expelled matter, such as phlegm, from the throat or lungs stained gray, black, or red
- Wheezing
- Loss of appetite
- Fatigue
- Emaciation
- Soreness in stomach region
- General malaise

== Treatment and prevention ==
There is no definitive cure for chalicosis, nor is there a specific targeted therapy. Current treatment of this lung disorder primarily involves managing respiratory symptoms, associated comorbidities, and complications, with the overarching goal of enhancing the patient's quality of life. These include:

=== Acute pharmacotherapies ===
- Corticosteroids are a class of steroid hormones that can be used for acute management of chalicotic symptoms.They are not recommended for chronic management.

=== Chronic pharmacotherapies ===
- Whole lung lavage uses saline solution to wash out lodged particles in the lungs.
- Bronchodilators dilate the bronchi and bronchioles to increase airflow to the lungs.
- Oxygen therapy or supplemental oxygen is a medical treatment that provides extra oxygen, often to prevent complications of chronic hypoxemia.
- Pulmonary rehabilitation is a therapeutic concept which utilizes a series of services to aid improved breathing.
- Antifibrotics.
- Smoking cessation.
- Lung transplantation is a last resort in which one lung, both, or damaged lung tissue are replaced with a donor during a surgical procedure.
