= Baritosis =

Benign type of pneumoconiosis

- Barium
- Specialty: Pulmonology

Baritosis is a benign type of pneumoconiosis, which is caused by long-term exposure to the dust of insoluble compounds of barium, such as ground baryte ore.

The disease may develop after few months of exposure. Barium compounds have a high radio-opacity. Extremely dense, discrete small opacities of 2–4 mm diameter, sometimes of a star-like configuration, are seen on the radiograph. Their distribution is uniform. When they are very numerous, superimposition may give the impression of confluency, but this does not seem to occur in reality. The hilar lymph nodes can be very opaque but not enlarged. After cessation of exposure, there is a gradual clearing of the opacities.

== Symptoms and signs ==
- Cough
- Wheezing
- Nasal irritation

In some cases, it is asymptomatic.

== Diagnosis ==
The particles of barium compounds can be seen as opaque shadows on the chest X-rays of people with baritosis. After exposure to barium compounds dust ceases, the X-ray abnormalities gradually resolve.

== Treatment ==
Once diagnosis has been confirmed, the most effective treatment is to eliminate exposure to barium compounds dust. When a persistent cough is present, expectorants may be prescribed to help cough out the sputum and particles of barium compounds. Cough suppressants and/or NSAIDs may be used to help reduce irritation and inflammation.
