= Silicosis =

Occupational lung disease caused by inhalation of crystalline silica

- Other names: Miner's phthisis; grinder's asthma; potter's rot
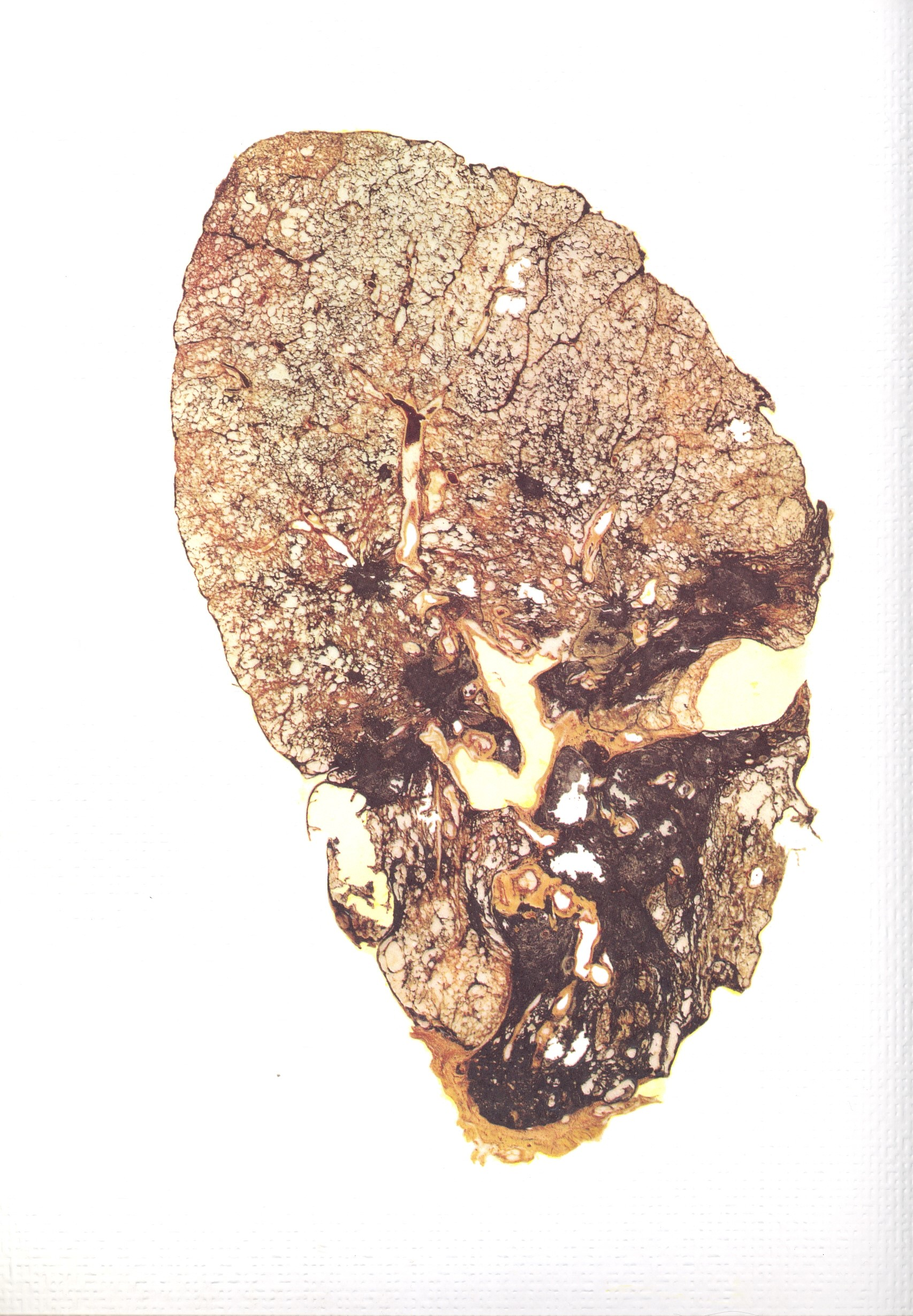
- Slice of a lung affected by silicosis
- Specialty: Pulmonology, Occupational medicine
- Types: Chronic (simple and progressive massive fibrosis); accelerated; acute
- Causes: Inhalation of crystalline silica dust
- Differential diagnosis: Pulmonary talcosis, coal workers' pneumoconiosis

Silicosis is an occupational lung disease caused by the inhalation of respirable crystalline silica dust. It is characterized by lung inflammation and fibrosis that most commonly affect the upper lobes, and is classified as a form of pneumoconiosis. The disease occurs in chronic (simple and progressive massive fibrosis), accelerated, or acute forms, depending on the intensity and duration of exposure.

Common symptoms include shortness of breath, cough, fatigue, and cyanosis in severe cases. Because its clinical and radiographic features can resemble those of tuberculosis, pneumonia, or pulmonary edema, silicosis is sometimes misdiagnosed. There is no curative treatment – accordingly, management focuses on symptom control and the prevention of complications.

Silicosis is largely preventable through effective workplace controls that limit airborne silica exposure, such as engineering controls, ventilation, and appropriate respiratory protection.

== Signs and symptoms ==
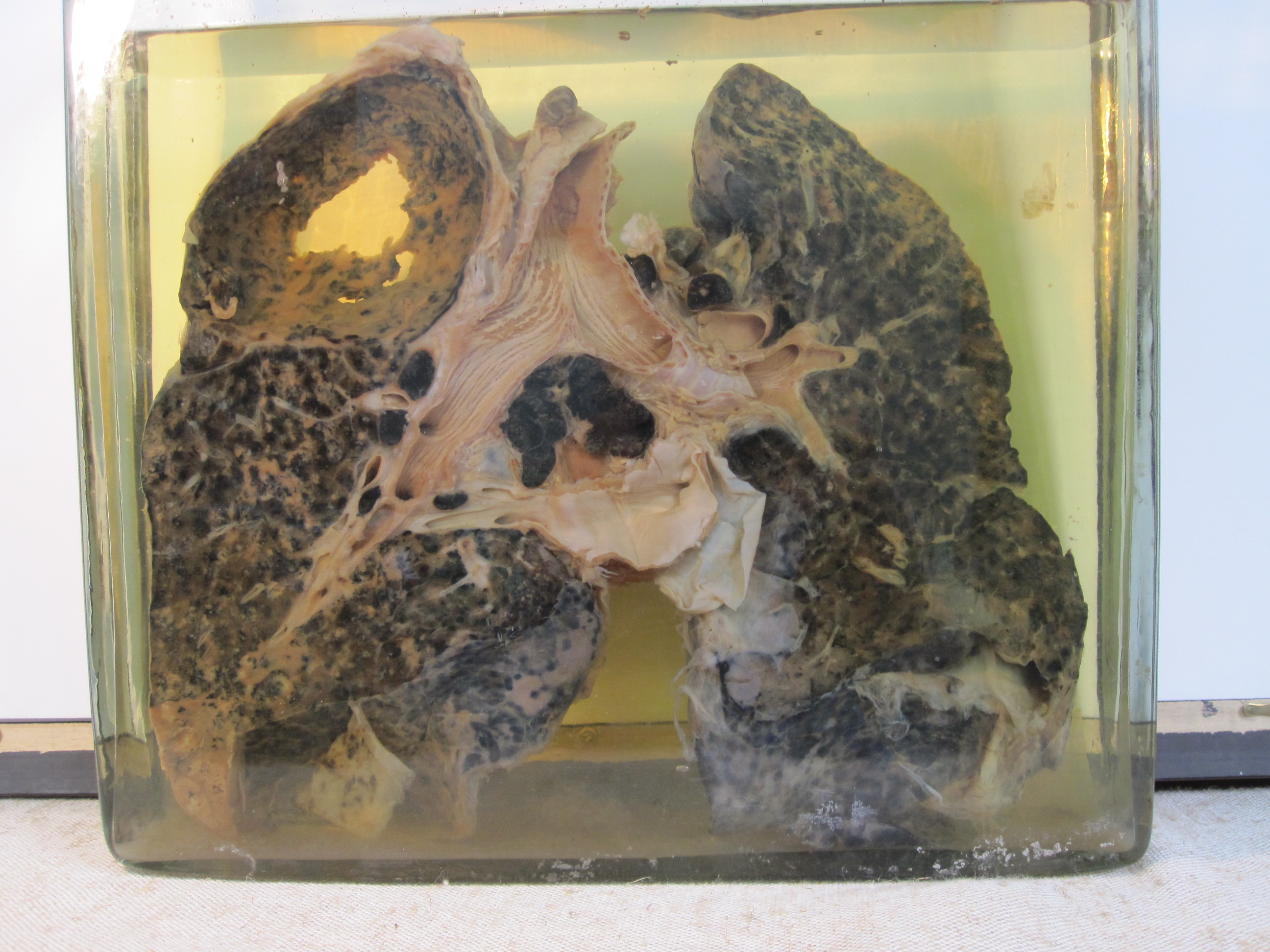
Miner's lung with silicosis and tuberculosis (Basque Museum of the History of Medicine and Science, Spain)

Because chronic silicosis is slow to develop, signs and symptoms may not appear until years after exposure. Signs and symptoms include:

- Dyspnea (shortness of breath) exacerbated by exertion
- Cough, often persistent and sometimes severe
- Fatigue
- Tachypnea (rapid breathing) which is often labored
- Loss of appetite and weight loss
- Chest pain
- Fever
- Gradual darkening of skin (blue skin)
- Gradual dark shallow rifts in nails eventually leading to cracks as protein fibers within nail beds are destroyed

In advanced cases, the following may also occur:

- Cyanosis, pallor along upper parts of body (blue skin)
- Cor pulmonale (right ventricle heart disease)
- Respiratory insufficiency

Patients with silicosis are particularly susceptible to tuberculosis (TB) infection—known as silicotuberculosis. The reason for the increased risk—3 fold increased incidence—is not well understood. It is thought that silica damages pulmonary macrophages, inhibiting their ability to kill mycobacteria. Even workers with prolonged silica exposure, but without silicosis, are at a similarly increased risk for TB.

Pulmonary complications of silicosis also include chronic bronchitis and airflow limitation (indistinguishable from that caused by smoking), non-tuberculous Mycobacterium infection, fungal lung infection, compensatory emphysema, and pneumothorax. There are some data revealing an association between silicosis and certain autoimmune diseases, including nephritis, scleroderma, and systemic lupus erythematosus, especially in acute or accelerated silicosis.

In 1996, the International Agency for Research on Cancer (IARC) reviewed the medical data and classified crystalline silica as "carcinogenic to humans." The risk was best seen in cases with underlying silicosis, with relative risks for lung cancer of 2–4. Numerous subsequent studies have been published confirming this risk. In 2006, Pelucchi et al. concluded, "The silicosis-cancer association is now established, in agreement with other studies and meta-analysis."

== Pathophysiology ==
Silica dust particles are sufficiently small to enter terminal lung airways and alveoli where the particles are coated with surfactant. Levels of surfactant increase in a temporary protective manner, after which the surfactant is digested by defensive proteins that accumulate as alveolar debris – a condition called silicoproteinosis, a hallmark of silicosis and impending pulmonary fibrosis.

In attempts to clear the lungs of inhaled dust and protein debris, alveolar macrophages and lysosomes engulf the particles, leading to an increase in digestive enzymes in macrophages, which can stimulate cell death and further accumulation of cell debris. Accumulated macrophage debris collecting in damaged alveoli triggers fibroblast activity, leading to fibrosis, formation of silica-dense nodules, and reduced lung surface area available for gas exchange. The silica particles released by macrophage deterioration can become part of a cycle of debris accumulation, inflammation, lung damage, and inability to breathe.

The most common histopathological finding of silicosis is called a silicotic nodule having zones of collagen-ringed fibers with an outside region containing fibroblasts, lymphocytes, and silica particle-imbedded macrophages.

=== Silica ===
Silicon (Si) is the second most common element in the Earth's crust after oxygen. The compound silica, also known as silicon dioxide (SiO_{2}), is formed from silicon and oxygen atoms. Since oxygen and silicon make up about 75% of the Earth's crust, the compound silica is common in soil and rocks, such as granite, sandstone, gneiss and slate, and in some metallic ores. Silica can be a main component of sand. It can also be in soil, mortar, plaster, and shingles. The cutting, breaking, crushing, drilling, grinding, or abrasive blasting of these materials may produce fine to ultra-fine airborne silica dust.

Silica occurs in three forms: crystalline, microcrystalline (or cryptocrystalline) and amorphous (non-crystalline). "Free" silica is composed of pure silicon dioxide, not combined with other elements, whereas silicates (e.g., talc, asbestos, and mica) are SiO_{2} combined with an appreciable portion of cations.

- Crystalline silica exists in seven different forms (polymorphs), depending upon the temperature of formation. The main three polymorphs are quartz, cristobalite, and tridymite. Quartz is the second most common mineral in the world (next to feldspar).
- Microcrystalline silica consists of minute quartz crystals bonded together with amorphous silica. Examples include flint and chert.
- Amorphous silica exists either as diatomaceous earth, from the skeletons of diatoms, or as vitreous silica, produced by heating and then rapid cooling of crystalline silica. Amorphous silica is less toxic than crystalline, but not biologically inert, and diatomite, when heated, can convert to tridymite or cristobalite.

Silica flour is nearly pure SiO_{2} finely ground. Silica flour has been used as a polisher or buffer, as well as paint extender, abrasive, and filler for cosmetics. Silica flour has been associated with all types of silicosis, including acute silicosis.

Silicosis is due to deposition of fine respirable dust (less than 10 micrometers in diameter) containing crystalline silicon dioxide in the form of alpha-quartz, cristobalite, or tridymite.

== Diagnosis ==
There are three key elements to the diagnosis of silicosis. First, the patient history should reveal exposure to sufficient silica dust to cause this illness. Second, chest imaging (usually chest x-ray) that reveals findings consistent with silicosis. Third, there are no underlying illnesses that are more likely to be causing the abnormalities. Physical examination is usually unremarkable unless there is complicated disease. The examination findings are not specific for silicosis.

Pulmonary function testing may reveal airflow limitation, restrictive defects, reduced diffusion capacity, mixed defects, or may be normal, especially without complicated disease. Most cases of silicosis do not require tissue biopsy for diagnosis, but this may be necessary in some cases, primarily to exclude other conditions. Assessment of alveolar crystal burden in bronchoalveolar lavage fluid may aid diagnosis.

For uncomplicated silicosis, chest x-ray will confirm the presence of small (< 10 mm) nodules in the lungs, especially in the upper lung zones. Using the ILO classification system, these are of profusion 1/0 or greater and shape/size "p", "q", or "r". Lung zone involvement and profusion increases with disease progression. In advanced cases of silicosis, large opacity (> 1 cm) occurs from coalescence of small opacities, particularly in the upper lung zones.

With retraction of the lung tissue, there is compensatory emphysema. Enlargement of the hilum is common with chronic and accelerated silicosis. In about 5–10% of cases, the nodes will calcify circumferentially, producing so-called "eggshell" calcification. This finding, however, is not exclusively diagnostic of silicosis. In some cases, the pulmonary nodules may also become calcified.

A computed tomography or CT scan can also provide a mode detailed analysis of the lungs, and can reveal cavitation due to concomitant mycobacterial infection.

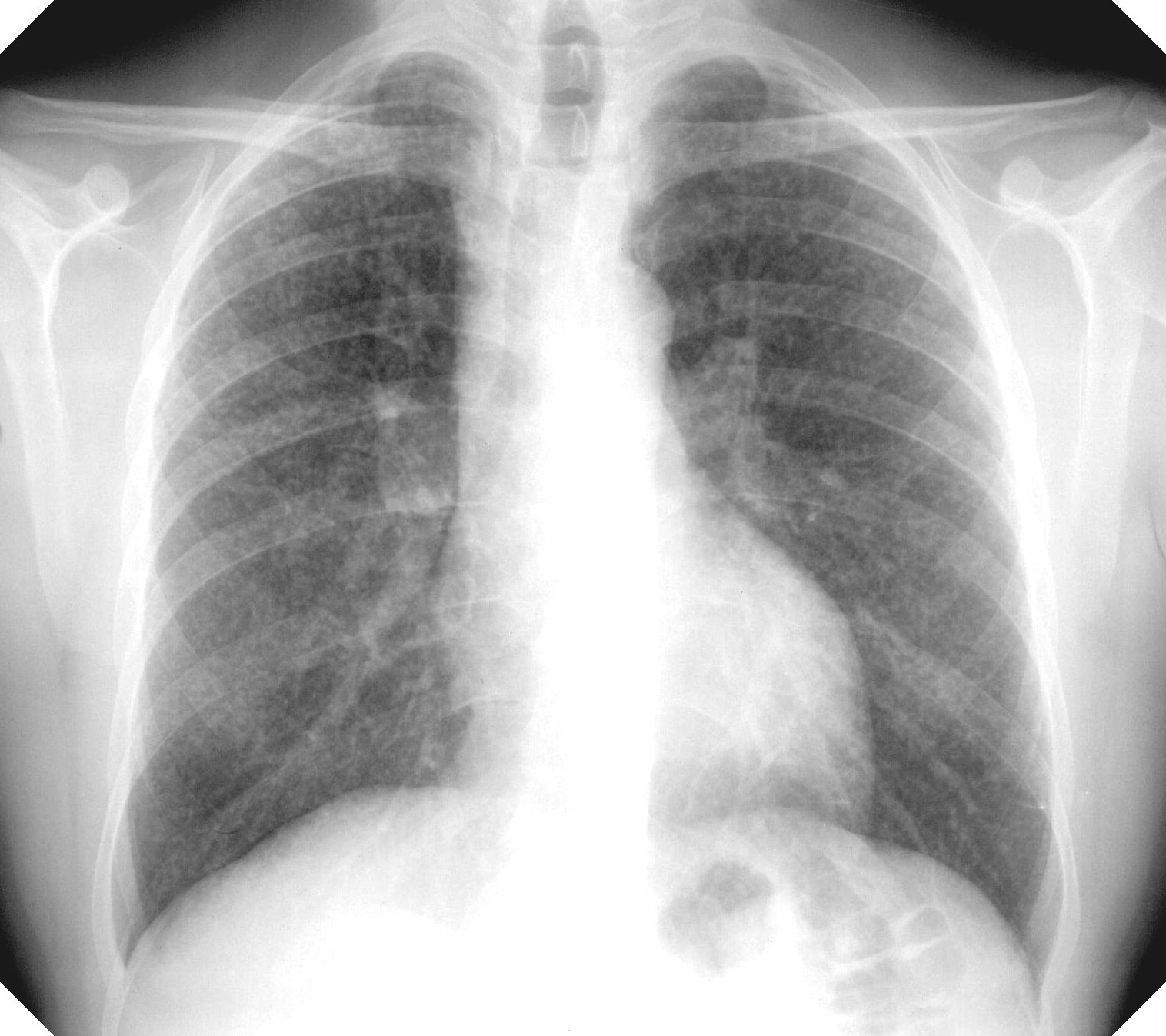
Chest X-ray showing uncomplicated silicosis

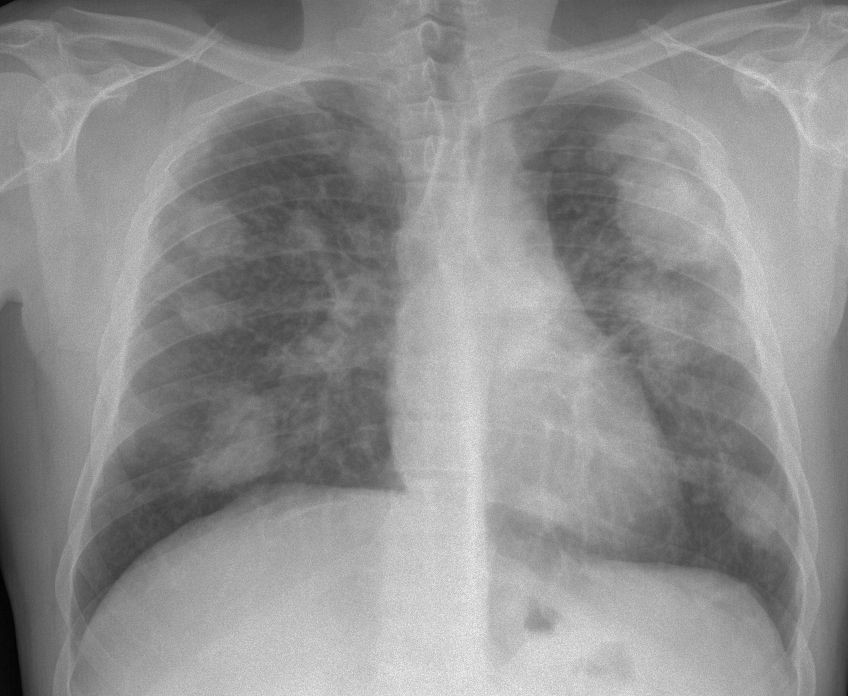
Complicated silicosis

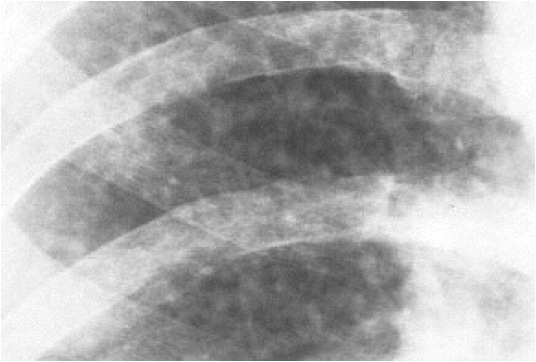
Silicosis ILO Classification 2-2 R-R

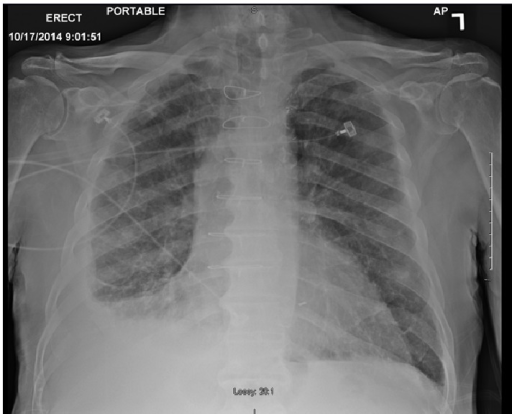
Fibrothorax and pleural effusion caused by silicosis

=== Classification ===
Classification of silicosis is made according to the disease's severity (including radiographic pattern), onset, and rapidity of progression. These include:

Chronic simple silicosis
Usually resulting from long-term exposure (10 years or more) to relatively low concentrations of silica dust and usually appearing 10–30 years after first exposure. This is the most common type of silicosis. Patients with this type of silicosis, especially early on, may not have obvious signs or symptoms of disease, but abnormalities may be detected by x-ray. Chronic cough and exertional dyspnea (shortness of breath) are common findings. Radiographically, chronic simple silicosis reveals a profusion of small (<10 mm in diameter) opacities, typically rounded, and predominating in the upper lung zones.
Accelerated silicosis
Silicosis that develops 5–10 years after first exposure to higher concentrations of silica dust. Symptoms and x-ray findings are similar to chronic simple silicosis, but occur earlier and tend to progress more rapidly. Patients with accelerated silicosis are at greater risk for complicated disease, including progressive massive fibrosis (PMF).
Complicated silicosis
Silicosis can become "complicated" by the development of severe scarring (progressive massive fibrosis, or also known as conglomerate silicosis), where the small nodules gradually become confluent, reaching a size of 1 cm or greater. PMF is associated with more severe symptoms and respiratory impairment than simple disease. Silicosis can also be complicated by other lung disease, such as tuberculosis, non-tuberculous mycobacterial infection, and fungal infection, certain autoimmune diseases, and lung cancer. Complicated silicosis is more common with accelerated silicosis than with the chronic variety.
Acute silicosis
Silicosis that develops a few weeks to 5 years after exposure to high concentrations of respirable silica dust. This is also known as silicoproteinosis. Symptoms of acute silicosis include more rapid onset of severe disabling shortness of breath, cough, weakness, and weight loss, often leading to death. The x-ray usually reveals a diffuse alveolar filling with air bronchograms, described as a ground-glass appearance, and similar to pneumonia, pulmonary edema, alveolar hemorrhage, and alveolar cell lung cancer.

== Prevention ==
A video discussing a field-based approach to silica monitoring. Monitoring could help reduce exposure to silica.

Using the Hierarchy of Controls, there are various methods of preventing exposure to respirable crystalline silica. The best way to prevent silicosis is to avoid worker exposure to dust containing respirable crystalline silica. The next best preventive measure is to control the dust. Water-integrated tools are often used where dust is created during certain tasks. To avoid dust accumulating on clothing and skin, wear a disposable protective suit or seal clothes in an airtight bag and, if possible, shower once returning home.

When dust starts accumulating around a workplace, and the use of water-integrated tools is not feasible, an industrial vacuum should be used to contain and transport dust to a safe location for disposal. Dust can also be controlled through personal dry air filtering. The use of personal protective equipment (PPE) is a measure of last resort when attempting to control exposure to respirable crystalline silica.

Preventing silicosis may require specific measures. One example is during tunnel construction where purpose-designed cabins are used in addition to air scrubbers to filter the air during construction. Items to be considered when selecting respiratory protection include whether it provides the correct level of protection, if facial fit testing has been provided, if the wearer is absent of facial hair, and how filters will be replaced.

Exposure to siliceous dusts in the ceramics industry is reduced by either processing and using the source materials as aqueous suspension or as damp solids, or by the use of dust control measures such as local exhaust ventilation. These have been mandated by legislation, such as The Pottery (Health and Welfare) Special Regulations 1950. The Health and Safety Executive in the UK has produced guidelines on controlling exposure to respirable crystalline silica in potteries, and the British Ceramics Federation provide, as a free download, a guidance booklet.

== Treatment ==
Silicosis is a permanent disease with no cure. Treatment options currently available focus on alleviating the symptoms and preventing any further progress of the condition. These include:

- Whole lung lavage. this method involves repeatedly flushing the lungs with saline under intravenous anesthesia, together with mechanical ventilation, to remove the pathogenic factor
- Stopping further exposure to airborne silica, silica dust and other lung irritants, including tobacco smoking.
- Cough suppressants.
- Antibiotics for bacterial lung infection.
- Tuberculosis (TB) prophylaxis for those with positive tuberculin skin test or IGRA blood test.
- Prolonged anti-tuberculosis (multi-drug regimen) for those with active TB.
- Chest physiotherapy to help the bronchial drainage of mucus.
- Oxygen administration to treat hypoxemia, if present.
- Bronchodilators to facilitate breathing.
- Lung transplantation to replace the damaged lung tissue is the most effective treatment, but is associated with severe risks of its own from the lung transplant surgery as well as from consequences of long-term immunosuppression (e.g., opportunistic infections).
- For acute silicosis, bronchoalveolar lavage may alleviate symptoms, but does not decrease overall mortality.
- Preliminary work utilizing whole lung lavage for patients with artificial stone-associated silicosis has shown significant radiological improvement following the treatment.

== Epidemiology ==
Globally, silicosis resulted in 46,000 deaths in 2013, down from 55,000 deaths in 1990. Despite this downward trend in total deaths, silicosis remains a significant global health threat. It is a preventable, incurable, and sometimes fatal disease.

=== Occupational silicosis ===
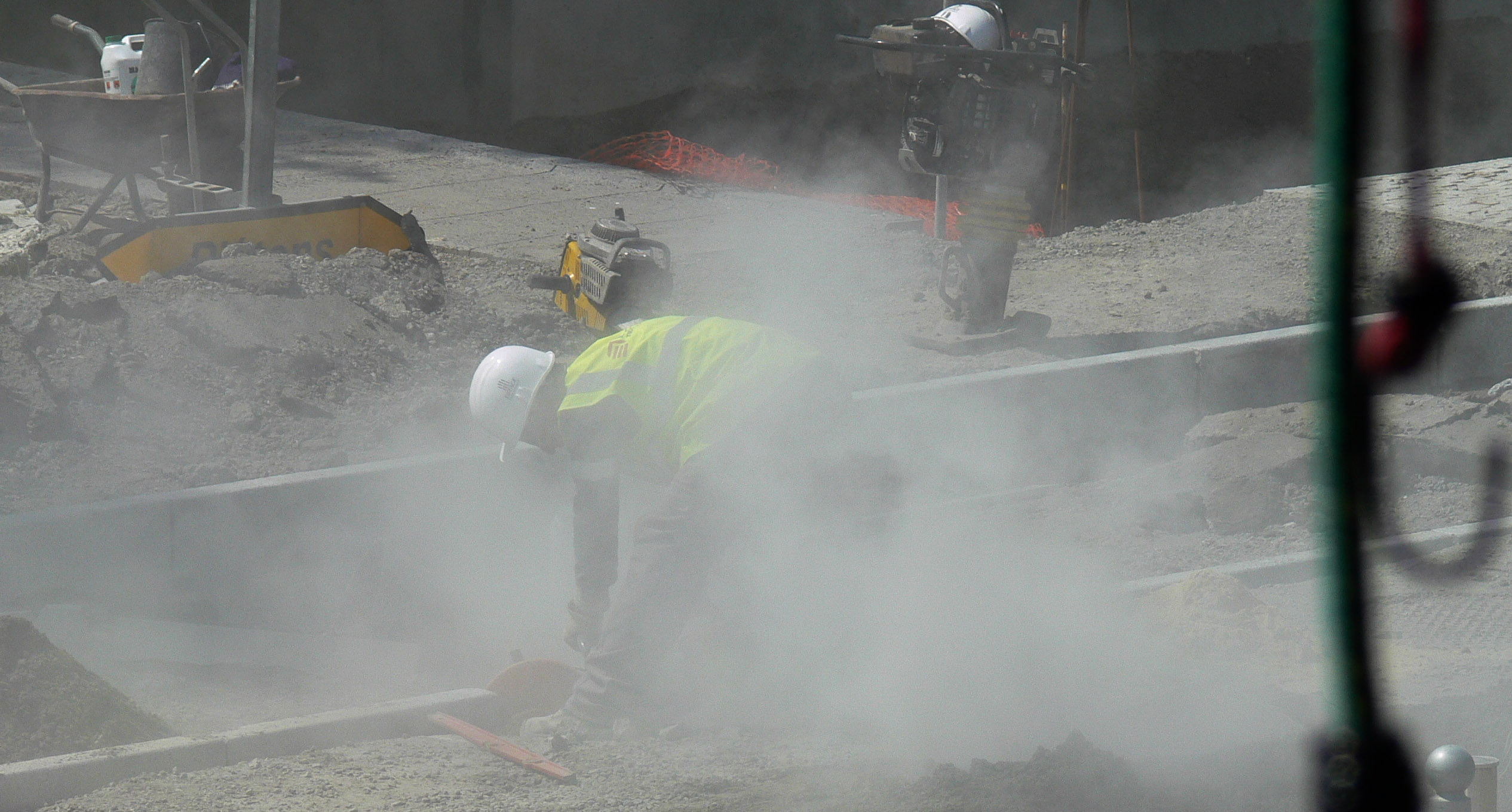
Workers in a cloud of concrete dust containing respirable crystalline silica with no controls in place

Silicosis is the most common occupational lung disease worldwide. Because of work-exposure to silica dust, silicosis is an occupational hazard to construction, railroad, demolition, mining, sandblasting, quarry, tunnelling, ceramics and foundry workers, as well as grinders, stone countertop fabricators, refractory brick workers, tombstone workers, workers in the oil and gas industry, pottery workers, fiberglass manufacturing, glass manufacturing, flintknappers and others. Brief or casual exposure to low levels of crystalline silica dust do not produce clinically significant lung disease.

In the United States, it is estimated that between one and two million workers have had occupational exposure to crystalline silica dust and 59,000 of these workers will develop silicosis sometime in the course of their lives. In the US between 1995 and 2004, there was an annual recorded average of roughly 30 silicosis-related deaths. In the UK, the latest data from The Health and Safety Executive show that there are typically between 10 and 20 annual silicosis deaths in recent years, with an average of 12 per year over the last 10 years.

There has been a recent rise of cases in Australia, China and the United States associated with the manufacture and installation of engineered stone surfaces in kitchens and bathrooms. Engineered stone has become increasingly common, and it contains a very high proportion of silica, more than natural stone. Engineered stone-associated silicosis has shorter latency periods and accelerated decline in lung function in comparison to natural stone-associated silicosis.

==== Epidemics of occupational silicosis ====
- In the United States, a 1930 epidemic of silicosis due to the construction of the Hawks Nest Tunnel near Gauley Bridge, West Virginia, caused the death of at least 400 workers. Other accounts place the mortality figure at well over 1000 workers, primarily African American transient workers from the southern United States.
- The goldmining establishment of Delamar Ghost Town, Nevada, was afflicted by a dry-mining process that produced a silicosis-causing dust, because the gold was embedded in quartzite. The town was nicknamed "the widowmaker" after hundreds of silicosis-related deaths. A nozzle spraying a mist of water was added to the drill, which turning the dust raised by drilling into mud, but this inhibited mining work.
- Silicosis has been identified as one of many long-term health outcomes for first responders from the terrorist attacks of September 11, 2001, after having been exposed to dust containing high concentrations of respirable crystalline silica, as well as other metals and toxins.

=== Non-occupational silicosis ===
- Chronic simple silicosis has been reported to occur from environmental exposures to silica in regions with high silica soil content and frequent dust storms.
- Silicosis is seen in horses associated with inhalation of dust from certain cristobalite-containing soils in California.

==== Desert lung disease ====
A non-occupational form of silicosis, desert lung disease, is caused by long-term exposure to sand dust in desert areas, with cases reported from the Sahara, Libyan desert and the Negev. The disease is caused by deposition of sand dust in the lungs. Desert lung disease may be related to Al Eskan disease, a lung disorder thought to be caused by exposure to sand dust containing organic antigens, first diagnosed after the Gulf War. The relative importance of the silica particles and the microorganisms that they carry in health effects remains unclear.

== Occupational safety regulation ==
=== Australia ===
On 1 July 2024, Australia implemented a complete ban on the manufacture and use of engineered stone benchtops, panels, or slabs, and these products became prohibited imports on 1 January 2025. In doing so, it was the first country in the world to totally ban engineered stone countertops.

=== United States ===
==== Federal regulation ====
In March 2016, OSHA mandated that companies must provide certain safety measures for employees who work with or around silica, in order to prevent silicosis, lung cancer, and other silica-related diseases. As part of the updated standard, OSHA created a table of engineering and administrative control methods to reduce silica exposure when using specific tools in 18 different applications that are known to create an exposure to silica. The key provisions of the updated standard include:

- The reduction of the permissible exposure limit (PEL) for respirable crystalline silica from 250 to 50 micrograms per cubic meter of air, averaged over an 8-hour shift.
- Shifts the focus of controlling silica exposure from the use of PPE (respirators) to the use of engineering controls (such as using water-integrated tools or vacuum systems) and administrative controls (limiting exposure time per shift).
- Employers are still required to provide respirators when engineering and administrative controls cannot adequately limit exposure.
- Additional provisions include limiting worker access to high exposure areas, signage requirements in high exposure areas, the development of a written exposure control plan, and training for workers on silica risks and how to limit exposures.
- Special equipment may be needed to prevent machine water from evaporating and leaving behind dust, and the standard also provides requirements for cleaning up the slurry left behind when water-integrated tools are used as an engineering control.
- Requires medical exams for highly exposed workers which include a discussion with a physician or licensed health care provider (PLHCP) of prior respiratory health, chest X-ray, pulmonary function test, latent tuberculosis infection, and any other tests deemed necessary by the PLHCP, which are to occur within 30 days of initial silica exposure and must be made available for renewal at least every three years unless the PLHCP deems otherwise.

==== California ====
In 2019, the California Department of Public Health began conducting statewide multi-source surveillance for silicosis. In June 2025, CDPH classified silicosis as a "reportable disease," which increases CDPH's ability to track cases across the state.

== See also ==
- Pneumoconiosis – Scarring of the lungs due to inhaling dust over long periods
- Asbestosis – Pneumoconiosis caused by inhalation and retention of asbestos fibers
- Health effects arising from the September 11 attacks – Health issues and effects during and after the September 11 attacks
- Hawks Nest Tunnel disaster – 1930–1935 industrial disaster in the U.S. state of West Virginia
- Dust pneumonia
- Frances Perkins
- Occupational dust exposure
