= Great veins =

The term Great veins can refer to either —

- The two venae cavae, the superior vena cava, a large diameter, short, vein that carries deoxygenated blood from the upper half of the body to the heart's right atrium, and the inferior vena cava, the large vein that carries deoxygenated blood from the lower half of the body into the right atrium
- or to the four pulmonary veins (two from each lung)

Great vein can be used to refer to any of these veins.
