= Pulmonary talcosis =

- Other names: Talcosis
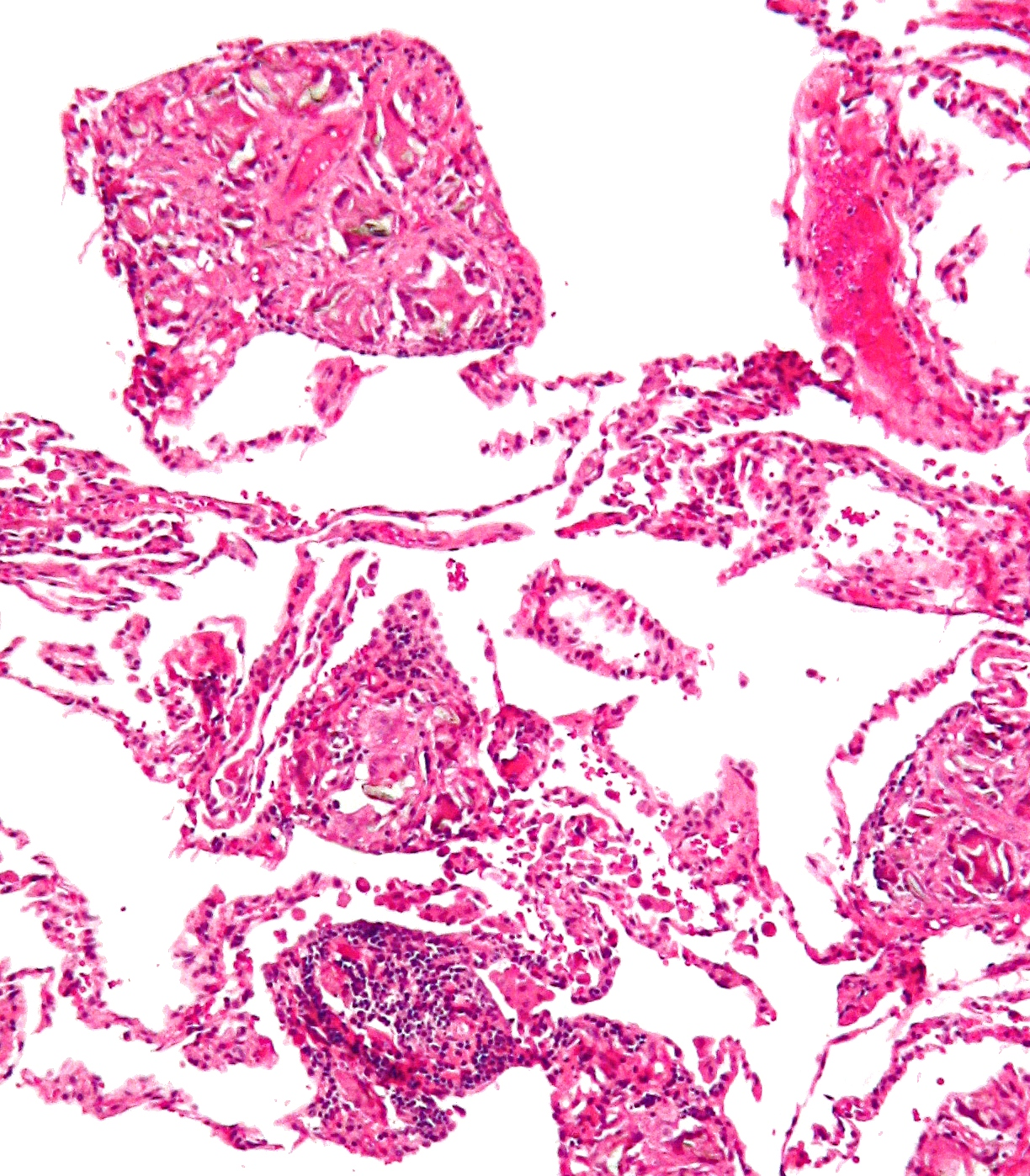
- Pulmonary talcosis. H&E stain.
- Specialty: Respirology
- Differential diagnosis: Silicosis

Pulmonary talcosis is a pulmonary disorder caused by talc.

It has been related to silicosis resulting from inhalation of talc and silicates. It is also tied to heroin use where talc might be used as an adulterant to increase weight and street value. It is one of several noted associations and possible risks of street heroin use. Talcosis can also arise from the injection of drugs intended for oral administration, as talc is present in many tablets and capsules that are used intravenously, such as benzodiazepines, dextroamphetamine, and prescription opioids.
