= Structured light plethysmography =

- Purpose: noninvasive method for collecting accurate representations of chest and abdominal wall movement

Structured Light Plethysmography (SLP) technology is a noninvasive method for collecting accurate representations of chest and abdominal wall movement. A checkerboard pattern of light is projected from a light projector onto the chest of an individual. Movements of the grid are viewed by two digital cameras, digitalised, and processed to form a 3D model and can be interrogated to assess lung function. The system has been tested on over 70 adults (data presented at clinical meetings). SLP is simple to use, accurate and cost effective, is self-calibrating and does not require the use of plastic consumables, reducing cost, risk of cross infection and the device's carbon footprint. In conjunction with the Cambridge Veterinary School, proof of concept studies have indicated that the device is sensitive enough to noninvasively pick up respiratory movements in domestic animals (cats and dogs).

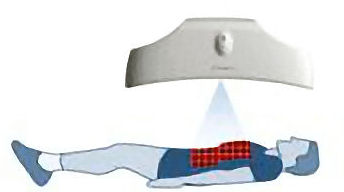

A totally “non-invasive” technique using structured light to measure pulmonary function was developed as long ago as the mid-1980s by a London group at the Royal Brompton Hospital working in close association with IBM (1-4). The technique used the distortion with movement of a structured pattern of light to calculate a volume or change in volume of a textured surface. At that time structured light pattern was shone on to the anterior chest and abdominal wall surfaces, and movie camera film footage was taken and sent to IBM for processing. The digital information was used to compute automatically the volume of the trunk and the position of any point on its surface and its cross-sectional shape at any level. The group found that linear dimensions could be calculated to within 0.5mm and a cross-sectional area within 5% and volume within 3-7%. The group suggested that non-invasive technique measurements were of sufficient accuracy to be tried in clinical practice. However, probably due to technology limitations, data processing and storage, the methodology was never commercialised.

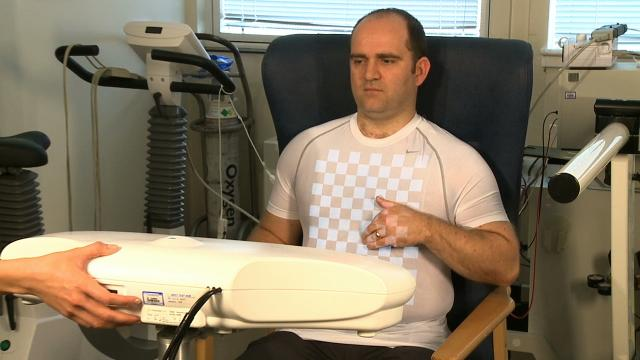
Seated patient preparing for chest SLP scan

Independently the Royal Brompton group of the 1980s, a Cambridge (UK) consortium of clinicians and engineers developed a system in 2009 that has revisited structure light pattern as a noninvasive method for collecting accurate representations of chest and abdominal wall movement. The methodology has several advantages: there are no fluorescent markers required to define chest or abdominal surface and the hardware can be minimalized to 2 digital cameras and a digital projector when imaging the anterior surface of the body. The projector shines a grid of black and white squares from superior iliac crest to clavicle; the subject can wear a plain t-shirt of any colour. The 2 digital cameras image the grid on chest and abdomen and the software extracts 2 sets of 2D image positions of the grid points and stereo vision is used to reconstruct these grid points to form a 3D representation of the chest and abdominal wall surface. The group has tried anything from one grid point to 2000 and is current working on roughly 200 to 300. The thoracic volume is calculated from the volume beneath the reconstructed virtual surface and can be plotted in real time. Calibration is internal: the relative position of cameras and shape of the subject is auto-calibrated at reconstruction time; and externally by placing an object of reference size in front of the cameras. This can be a sheet of paper of known size and potentially has now been transferred to projected points within the grid itself. The group have now collected data on up to 70 adults and 5 children and have also collected data from small mammals. They have compared simultaneous measurements of tidal breathing followed by full inspiration and force expiration by pneumotach and SLP. The pneumotach data was obtained using a laptop based spirometer and exported for analysis using J-scope software. Extremely good correlations have been obtained from tidal breathing and forced expiration manoeuvres. Tidal breathing correlations have shown to be 0.99 for individual data sets and for n=70 the mean correlation was 0.92 at an SD of 0.04. For forced expiration the correlation was shown to be 0.98, n=70 mean correlation was 0.98 with an SD of 0.12. For forced expirations inspiratory manoeuvres correlation coefficients for peak flow were r² 0.84, FEV1 0.95, FEF75 0.76 and FEF50 0.69.

== Patient Example Outputs ==
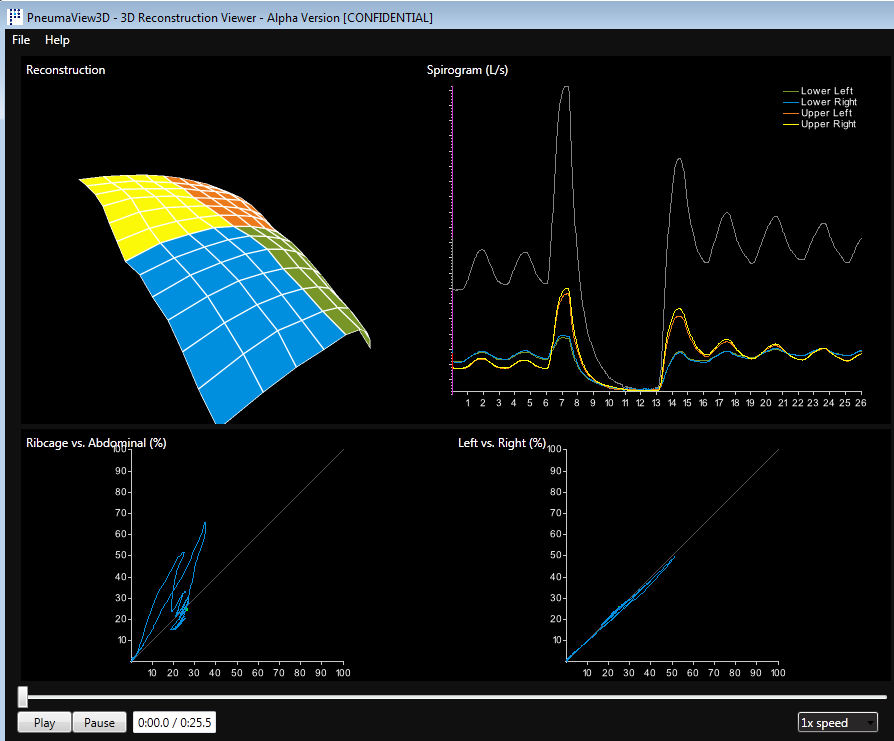
Healthy Patient SLP Scan

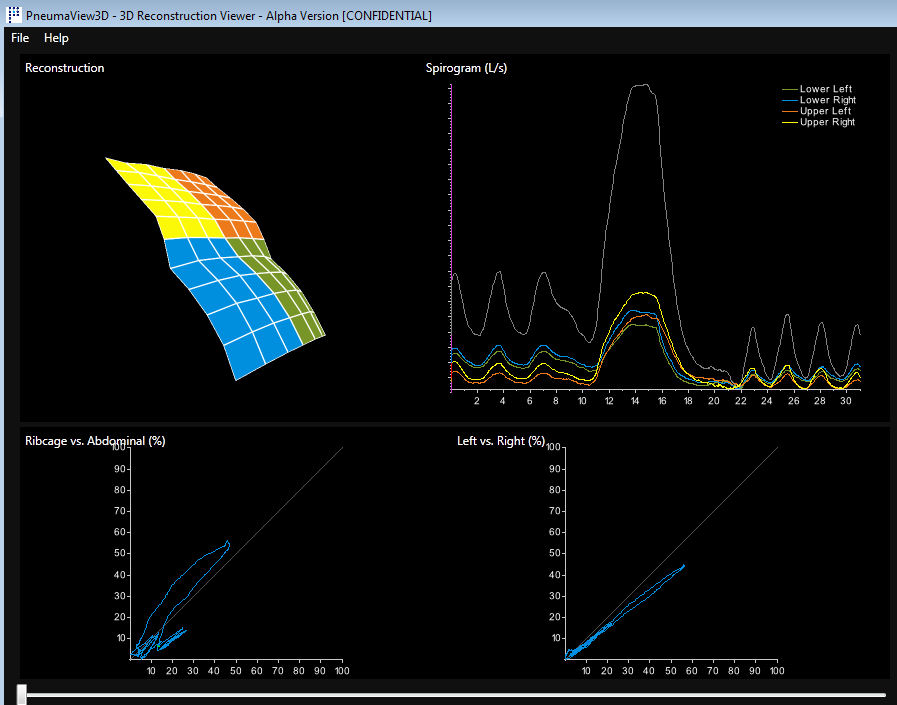
Thoracic Patient SLP Scan

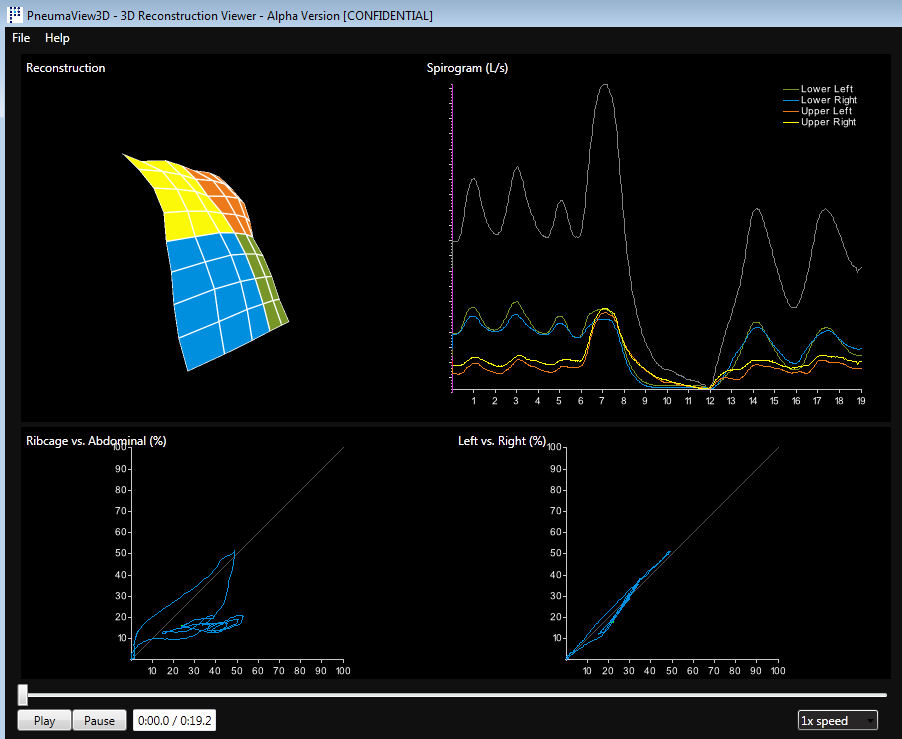
Diseased Patient SLP Scan

Being totally non-invasive SLP allows respiratory monitoring without the need for a face mask or mouth piece, allowing for normal respiratory patterns to be recorded. Data output can be configured to allow for the comparisons between selected regions of interest such as chest and abdomen. Further analysis uses spectral analysis techniques to monitor trends and changes in respiratory function and alterations in regional chest dynamics. The group has a number of studies on-going .

The first application of this technology has been developed to measure spirometry by PneumaCare Ltd, The device - PneumaScan has been developed by PneumaCare in partnership with Cambridge University, Addenbrookes NHS Hospital Trust and Plextek Limited. It is capable of recording tidal breathing and spirometry parameters and is self calibrating.
