= Bronchial challenge test =

Medical test used to assist in the diagnosis of asthma

- MeSH: D001985
- OPS-301 code: 1-714
- LOINC: 65806-2

A bronchial challenge test is a medical test used to assist in the diagnosis of asthma, by evaluating existence of possible airway hyperresponsiveness. The patient breathes in nebulized methacholine or histamine. Thus the test may also be called a methacholine challenge test or histamine challenge test respectively. Both drugs provoke bronchoconstriction, or narrowing of the airways. Whereas histamine causes nasal and bronchial mucus secretion and bronchoconstriction via the H1 receptor, methacholine utilizes the M3 receptor for bronchoconstriction. The degree of narrowing can then be quantified by spirometry. People with pre-existing airway hyperreactivity, such as asthmatics, will react to lower doses of drug.

Sometimes, to assess the reversibility of a particular condition, a bronchodilator is administered to counteract the effects of the bronchoconstrictor before repeating the spirometry tests. This is commonly referred to as a reversibility test, or a post bronchodilator test (post BD), and may help in distinguishing asthma from chronic obstructive pulmonary disease. Also, a DLCO test can be used to distinguish asthma (normal to high DLCO) from COPD (reduced DLCO).

False positives and negatives are possible in the bronchial challenge test. In addition, asthma may be temporary due to an exposure to noxious stimuli or exercise.

The bronchial challenge test is physically demanding, and the results can be affected by muscular weakness or exhaustion. The inhaled drug can stimulate the upper airway sufficiently to cause violent coughing. This can make spirometry difficult or impossible. This test is contraindicated in patients with severe airway obstruction due to the obvious worsening of the obstruction. It is also contraindicated by the presence of an aortic aneurysm, as spirometry will increase blood pressure, in proportion to both the patient's effort and the degree of obstruction in the lungs.
