= Diffusing capacity for carbon monoxide =

Term in medicine

D_{LCO} or T_{LCO} (diffusing capacity or transfer factor of the lung for carbon monoxide (CO),) is the extent to which oxygen passes from the air sacs of the lungs into the blood. Commonly, it refers to the test used to determine this parameter. It was introduced in 1909.

== Mechanism ==
This test involves measuring the partial pressure difference between inspired and expired carbon monoxide. It relies on the strong affinity and large absorption capacity of red blood cells for carbon monoxide and thus demonstrates gas uptake by the capillaries that are less dependent on cardiac output. The measurement of D_{LCO} is affected by atmospheric pressure and/or altitude and correction factors can be calculated using the method recommended by the American Thoracic Society. Expected D_{LCO} is also affected by the amount of hemoglobin, carboxyhemoglobin, age and sex. The correction for hemoglobin is based on the method of Cotes as recommended by the American Thoracic Society.

== D_{LCO} vs T_{LCO} ==
Generally D_{LCO} is measured in "ml/min/kPa" and T_{LCO} is measured in "mmol/min/kPa".

== Factors affecting D_{LCO} ==
=== Decrease ===
D_{LCO} is decreased in any condition which affects the effective alveolar surface area:

1. Hindrance in the alveolar wall. e.g. fibrosis, alveolitis, vasculitis
2. Decrease of total lung area, e.g. Restrictive lung disease or lung resection (partial or total).
3. Chronic obstructive pulmonary disease (Emphysema) due to decreased surface area in the alveoli, as well as damage to the capillary bed
4. Pulmonary embolism
5. Cardiac insufficiency
6. Pulmonary hypertension
7. Bleomycin (upon administration of more than 200 units)
8. Anemia-due to decrease in blood volume
9. Amiodarone high cumulative dose; more than 400 milligrams per day
10. After chemotherapy and radiotherapy

However, many modern devices compensate for the hemoglobin value of the patient (taken by blood test), and excludes it as a factor in the DLCO interpretation.

=== Increase ===
Factors that can increase the D_{LCO} include polycythaemia, asthma (can also have normal D_{LCO}) and increased pulmonary blood volume as occurs in exercise. Other factors are left to right intracardiac shunting, mild left heart failure (increased blood volume) and alveolar hemorrhage (increased blood available for which CO does not have to cross a barrier to enter).

== Significance of results ==
There is no universally recognized reference value range for DLCO as of 2017, but values in the 80%-120% of predicted range based on instrument manufacturer standards are generally considered normal. A D_{LCO} of less than 60% predicted portends a poor prognosis for lung cancer resection. FEV_{1} is of lesser prognostic value for lung resection survival.

== See also ==
- Diffusing capacity
- Pulmonary diffusing capacity for nitric oxide
