= Spirometry =

Pulmonary function test

- Flow-Volume loop showing successful FVC maneuver. Positive values represent expiration, negative values represent inspiration. At the start of the test both flow and volume are equal to zero (representing the volume in the spirometer rather than the lung). The trace moves clockwise for expiration followed by inspiration. After the starting point the curve rapidly mounts to a peak (the peak expiratory flow). (Note the FEV1 value is arbitrary in this graph and just shown for illustrative purposes; these values must be calculated as part of the procedure).
- MeSH: D013147
- OPS-301 code: 1-712

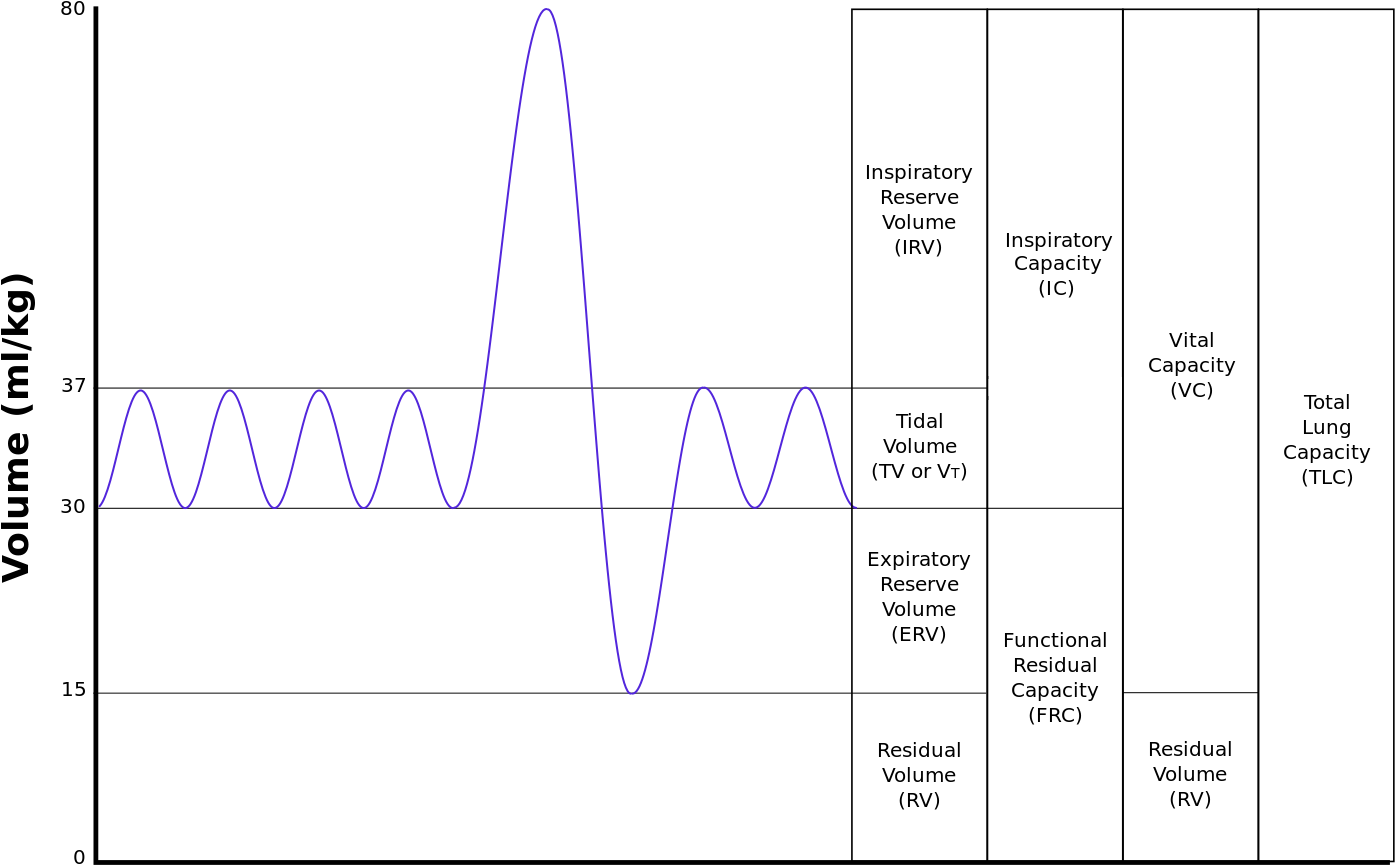
- TLC: Total lung capacity: the volume in the lungs at maximal inflation, the sum of VC and RV.
- TV: Tidal volume: that volume of air moved into or out of the lungs in 1 breath (TV indicates a subdivision of the lung; when tidal volume is precisely measured, as in gas exchange calculation, the symbol TV or V_{T} is used.)
- RV: Residual volume: the volume of air remaining in the lungs after a maximal exhalation
- ERV: Expiratory reserve volume: the maximal volume of air that can be exhaled from the end-expiratory position
- IRV: Inspiratory reserve volume: the maximal volume that can be inhaled from the end-inspiratory level
- IC: Inspiratory capacity: the sum of IRV and TV
- IVC: Inspiratory vital capacity: the maximum volume of air inhaled from the point of maximum expiration
- VC: Vital capacity: the volume of air breathed out after the deepest inhalation.
- V_{T}: Tidal volume: that volume of air moved into or out of the lungs during quiet breathing (VT indicates a subdivision of the lung; when tidal volume is precisely measured, as in gas exchange calculation, the symbol TV or V_{T} is used.)
- FRC: Functional residual capacity: the volume in the lungs at the end-expiratory position
- RV/TLC%: Residual volume expressed as percent of TLC
- V_{A}: Alveolar gas volume
- V_{L}: Actual volume of the lung including the volume of the conducting airway.
- FVC: Forced vital capacity: the determination of the vital capacity from a maximally forced expiratory effort
- FEV_{t}: Forced expiratory volume (time): a generic term indicating the volume of air exhaled under forced conditions in the first t seconds
- FEV_{1}: Volume that has been exhaled at the end of the first second of forced expiration
- FEF_{x}: Forced expiratory flow related to some portion of the FVC curve; modifiers refer to amount of FVC already exhaled
- FEF_{max}: The maximum instantaneous flow achieved during a FVC maneuver
- FIF: Forced inspiratory flow: (Specific measurement of the forced inspiratory curve is denoted by nomenclature analogous to that for the forced expiratory curve. For example, maximum inspiratory flow is denoted FIF_{max}. Unless otherwise specified, volume qualifiers indicate the volume inspired from RV at the point of measurement.)
- PEF: Peak expiratory flow: The highest forced expiratory flow measured with a peak flow meter
- MVV: Maximal voluntary ventilation: volume of air expired in a specified period during repetitive maximal effort

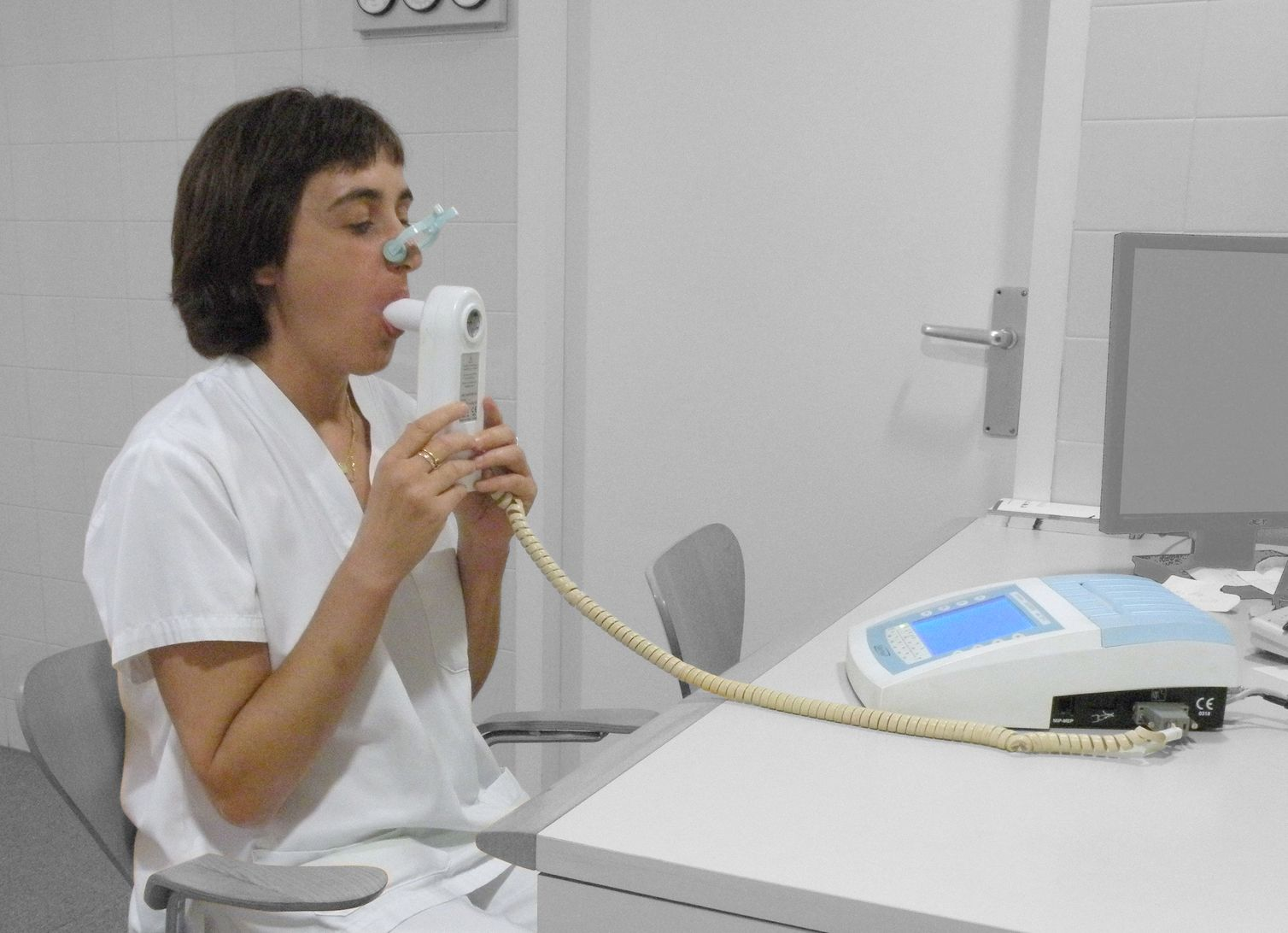
Doing spirometry

Spirometry (meaning the measuring of breath) is the most common of the pulmonary function tests (PFTs). It measures lung function, specifically the amount (volume) and/or speed (flow) of air that can be inhaled and exhaled. Spirometry is helpful in assessing breathing patterns that identify conditions such as asthma, pulmonary fibrosis, cystic fibrosis, and COPD. It is also helpful as part of a system of health surveillance, in which breathing patterns are measured over time.

Spirometry generates volume-time curves and also flow-volume loops, which are charts that plot the volume and flow of air coming in and out of the lungs from one inhalation and one exhalation.

== Testing ==
A modern USB PC-based spirometer.

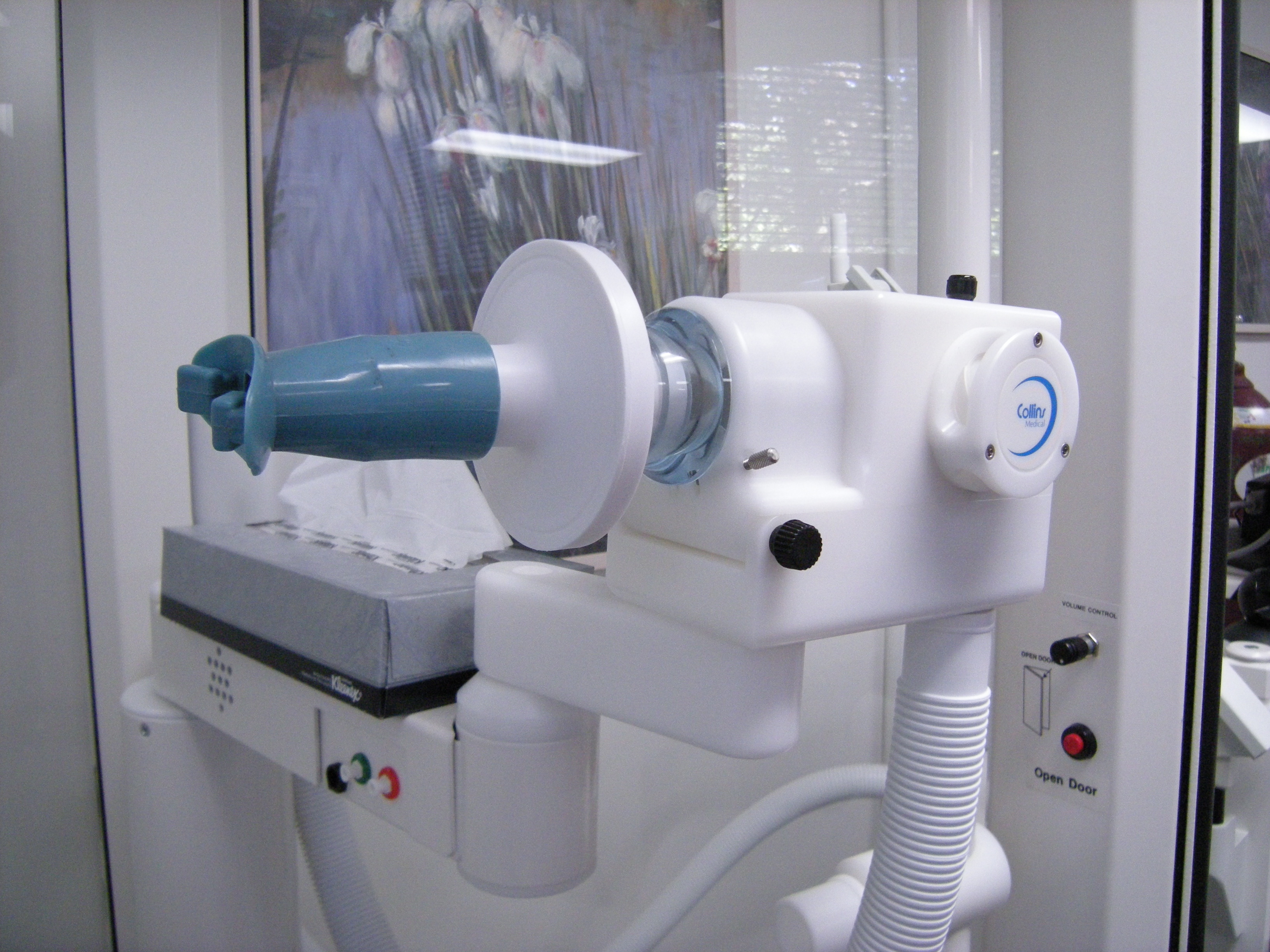
Device for spirometry. The patient places their lips around the blue mouthpiece. The teeth go between the nubs and the shield, and the lips go over the shield. A nose clip guarantees that breath will flow only through the mouth.

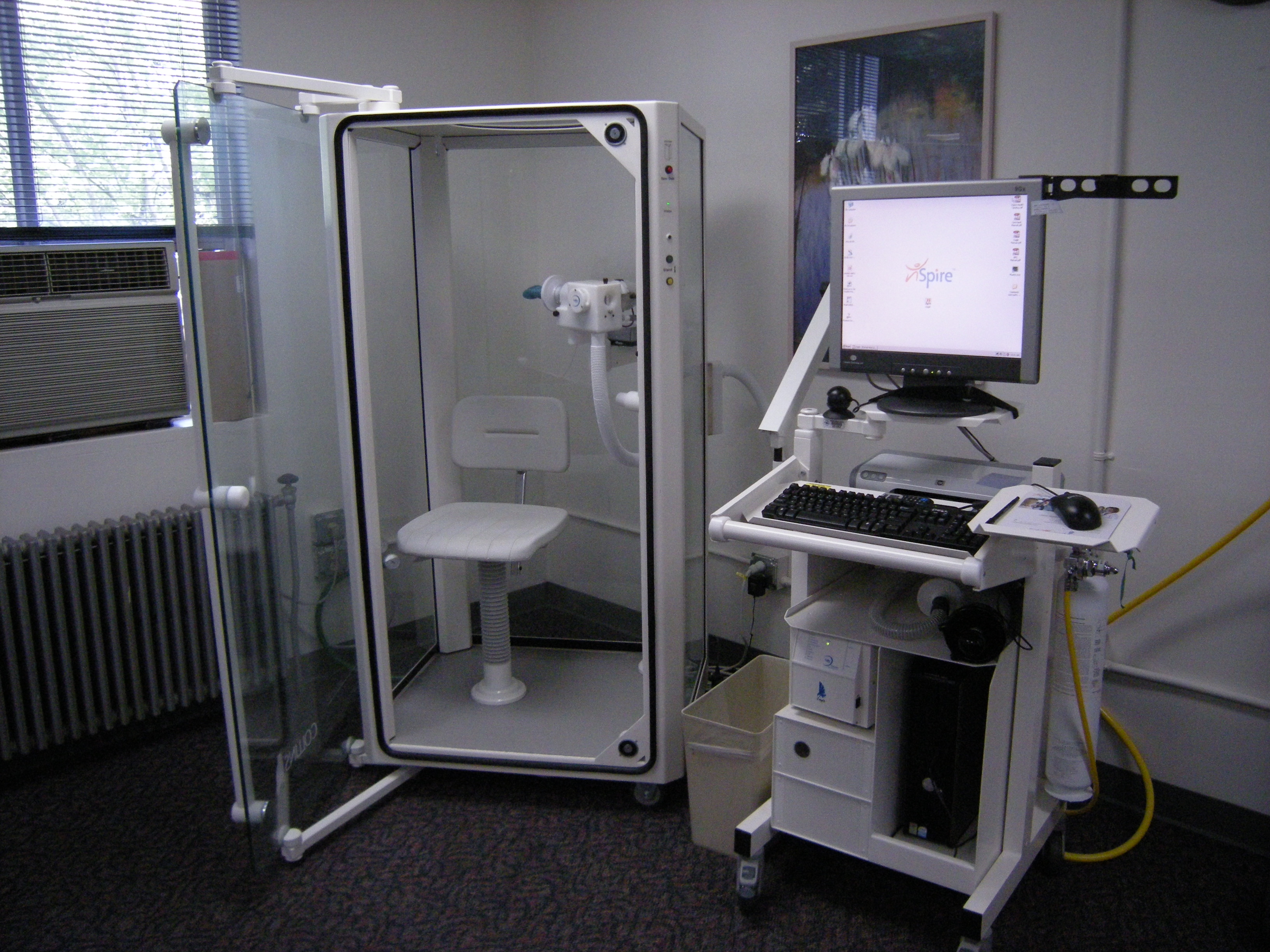
Screen for spirometry readouts at right. The chamber can also be used for body plethysmography.

=== Spirometer ===
The spirometry test is performed using a device called a spirometer, which comes in several different varieties. Most spirometers display the following graphs, called spirograms:

- a volume-time curve, showing volume (litres) along the Y-axis and time (seconds) along the X-axis
- a flow-volume loop, which graphically depicts the rate of airflow on the Y-axis and the total volume inspired or expired on the X-axis

=== Procedure ===
The basic forced volume vital capacity (FVC) test varies slightly depending on the equipment used. It can be in the form of either closed or open circuit. Regardless of differences in testing procedure providers are recommended to follow the ATS/ERS Standardisation of Spirometry. The standard procedure ensures an accurate and objectively collected set of data, based on a common reference, to reduce incompatibility of the results when shared across differing medical groups.

The patient is asked to put on soft nose clips to prevent air escape and a breathing sensor in their mouth forming an air tight seal. Guided by a technician, the patient is given step by step instructions to take an abrupt maximum effort inhale, followed by a maximum effort exhale lasting for a target of at least 6 seconds. When assessing possible upper airway obstruction, the technician will direct the patient to make an additional rapid inhalation to complete the round. The timing of the second inhale can vary between persons depending on the length of the preceding exhale. In some cases each round of test will be preceded by a period of normal, gentle breathing for additional data.

=== Limitations ===
Clinically useful results are highly dependent on patient cooperation and effort and must be repeated for a minimum of three times to ensure reproducibility with a general limit of ten attempts. Given variable rates of effort, the results can only be underestimated given an effort output greater than 100% is not possible.

Due to the need for patient cooperation and an ability to understand and follow instructions, spirometry can typically only be done in cooperative children when they are at least 5 years old or adults without physical or mental impairment preventing effective diagnostic results. In addition, general anesthesia and various forms of sedation are not compatible with the testing process.

Another limitation is that persons with intermittent or mild asthma can present normal spirometry values between acute exacerbation, reducing spirometry's effectiveness as a diagnostic tool in these circumstances.

=== Supplemental diagnostics ===
Spirometry can also be part of a bronchial challenge test, used to determine bronchial hyperresponsiveness to either rigorous exercise, inhalation of cold/dry air, or with a pharmaceutical agent such as methacholine or histamine.

To assess the reversibility of a particular condition, a bronchodilator can be administered before performing another round of tests for comparison. This is commonly referred to as a reversibility test, or a post bronchodilator test (Post BD), and is an important part in diagnosing asthma versus COPD.

Other complementary lung functions tests include plethysmography and nitrogen washout.

=== Indications ===
Spirometry is indicated for the following reasons:

- to diagnose or manage asthma
- to detect respiratory disease in patients presenting with symptoms of breathlessness, and to distinguish respiratory from cardiac disease as the cause
- to measure bronchial responsiveness in patients suspected of having asthma
- to diagnose and differentiate between obstructive lung disease and restrictive lung disease
- to follow the natural history of disease in respiratory conditions
- to assess of impairment from occupational asthma
- to identify those at risk from pulmonary barotrauma while scuba diving
- to conduct pre-operative risk assessment before anaesthesia or cardiothoracic surgery
- to measure response to treatment of conditions which spirometry detects
- to diagnose the vocal cord dysfunction.

=== Contraindications ===
Forced expiratory maneuvers may aggravate some medical conditions. Spirometry should not be performed when the individual presents with:

- Hemoptysis of unknown origin
- Pneumothorax
- Unstable cardiovascular status (angina, recent myocardial infarction, etc.)
- Thoracic, abdominal, or cerebral aneurysms
- Cataracts or recent eye surgery
- Recent thoracic or abdominal surgery
- Nausea, vomiting, or acute illness
- Recent or current viral infection
- Undiagnosed hypertension

== Parameters ==
The most common parameters measured in spirometry are vital capacity (VC), forced vital capacity (FVC), forced expiratory volume (FEV) at timed intervals of 0.5, 1.0 (FEV1), 2.0, and 3.0 seconds, forced expiratory flow 25–75% (FEF 25–75) and maximal voluntary ventilation (MVV), also known as Maximum breathing capacity. Other tests may be performed in certain situations.

Results are usually given in both raw data (litres, litres per second) and percent predicted—the test result as a percent of the "predicted values" for the patients of similar characteristics (height, age, sex, and sometimes race and weight). The interpretation of the results can vary depending on the physician and the source of the predicted values. Generally speaking, results nearest to 100% predicted are the most normal, and results over 80% are often considered normal. Multiple publications of predicted values have been published and may be calculated based on age, sex, weight and ethnicity. However, review by a doctor is necessary for accurate diagnosis of any individual situation.

A bronchodilator is also given in certain circumstances and a pre/post graph comparison is done to assess the effectiveness of the bronchodilator. See the example printout.

Functional residual capacity (FRC) cannot be measured via spirometry, but it can be measured with a plethysmograph or dilution tests (for example, helium dilution test).

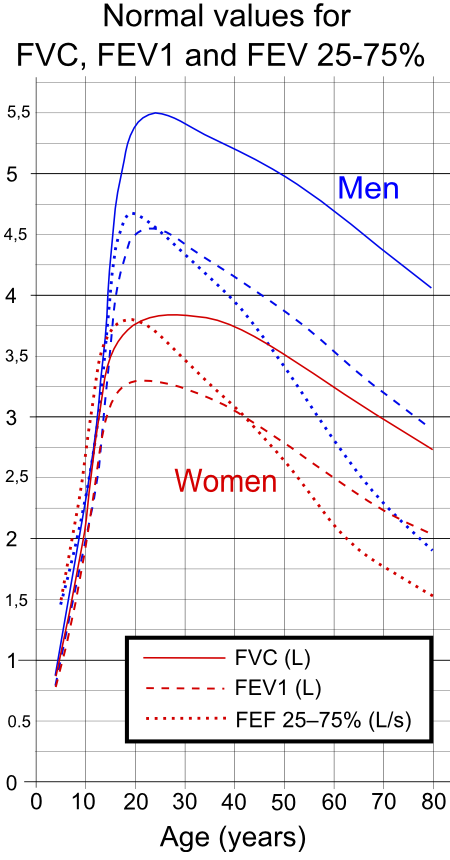
Average values for forced vital capacity (FVC), forced expiratory volume in 1 second (FEV1) and forced expiratory flow 25–75% (FEF25–75%), according to a study in the United States 2007 of 3,600 subjects aged 4–80 years. Y-axis is expressed in litres for FVC and FEV1, and in litres/second for FEF25–75%.

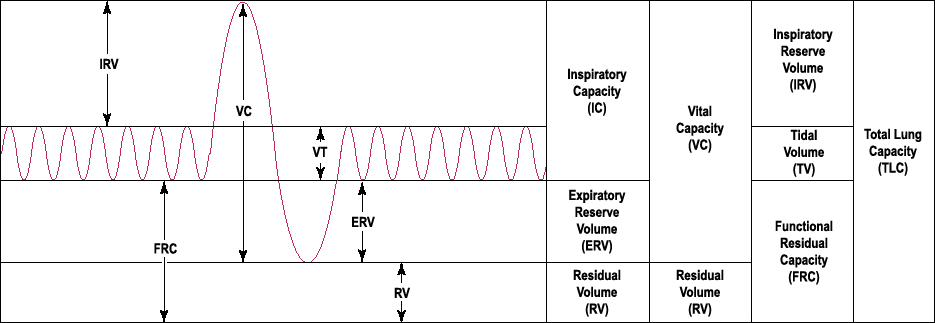

=== Forced vital capacity (FVC) ===
Forced vital capacity (FVC) is the volume of air that can forcibly be blown out after full inspiration, measured in liters. FVC is the most basic maneuver in spirometry tests.

=== Forced expiratory volume in 1 second (FEV1) ===
FEV1 is the volume of air that can forcibly be blown out in first 1-second, after full inspiration. Average values for FEV1 in healthy people depend mainly on sex and age, according to the diagram. Values of between 80% and 120% of the average value are considered normal. Predicted normal values for FEV1 can be calculated and depend on age, sex, height, mass and ethnicity as well as the research study that they are based on.

=== FEV1/FVC ratio ===
FEV1/FVC is the ratio of FEV1 to FVC. In healthy adults this should be approximately 70–80% (declining with age). In obstructive diseases (asthma, COPD, chronic bronchitis, emphysema) FEV1 is diminished because of increased airway resistance to expiratory flow; the FVC may be decreased as well, due to the premature closure of airway in expiration, just not in the same proportion as FEV1 (for instance, both FEV1 and FVC are reduced, but the former is more affected because of the increased airway resistance). This generates a reduced value (<70%, often ~45%). In restrictive diseases (such as pulmonary fibrosis) the FEV1 and FVC are both reduced proportionally and the value may be normal or even increased as a result of decreased lung compliance.

A derived value of FEV1 is FEV1% predicted (FEV1%), which is defined as FEV1 of the patient divided by the average FEV1 in the population for any person of the same age, height, gender, and race.

=== Forced expiratory flow (FEF) ===
Forced expiratory flow (FEF) is the flow (or speed) of air coming out of the lung during the middle portion of a forced expiration. It can be given at discrete times, generally defined by what fraction of the forced vital capacity (FVC) has been exhaled. The usual discrete intervals are 25%, 50% and 75% (FEF25, FEF50 and FEF75), or 25% and 50% of FVC that has been exhaled. It can also be given as a mean of the flow during an interval, also generally delimited by when specific fractions remain of FVC, usually 25–75% (FEF25–75%). Average ranges in the healthy population depend mainly on sex and age, with FEF25–75% shown in diagram at left. Values ranging from 50 to 60% and up to 130% of the average are considered normal. Predicted normal values for FEF can be calculated and depend on age, sex, height, mass and ethnicity as well as the research study that they are based on.

MMEF or MEF stands for maximal (mid-)expiratory flow and is the peak of expiratory flow as taken from the flow-volume curve and measured in liters per second. It should theoretically be identical to peak expiratory flow (PEF), which is, however, generally measured by a peak flow meter and given in liters per minute.

Recent research suggests that FEF25-75% or FEF25-50% may be a more sensitive parameter than FEV1 in the detection of obstructive small airway disease. However, in the absence of concomitant changes in the standard markers, discrepancies in mid-range expiratory flow may not be specific enough to be useful, and current practice guidelines recommend continuing to use FEV1, VC, and FEV1/VC as indicators of obstructive disease.

More rarely, forced expiratory flow may be given at intervals defined by how much remains of total lung capacity. In such cases, it is usually designated as e.g. FEF70%TLC, FEF60%TLC and FEF50%TLC.

=== Forced inspiratory flow 25–75% or 25–50% ===
Forced inspiratory flow 25–75% or 25–50% (FIF 25–75% or 25–50%) is similar to FEF 25–75% or 25–50% except the measurement is taken during inspiration.

=== Peak expiratory flow (PEF) ===
Normal values for peak expiratory flow (PEF), shown on EU scale.

Peak expiratory flow (PEF) is the maximal flow (or speed) achieved during the maximally forced expiration initiated at full inspiration, measured in liters per minute or in liters per second.

=== Tidal volume (TV) ===
Tidal volume is the amount of air inhaled or exhaled normally at rest.

=== Total lung capacity (TLC) ===
Total lung capacity (TLC) is the maximum volume of air present in the lungs.

=== Diffusing capacity (DLCO) ===
Diffusing capacity (or DLCO) is the carbon monoxide uptake from a single inspiration in a standard time (usually 10 seconds). During the test the person inhales a test gas mixture that consisting of regular air that includes an inert tracer gas and CO, less than one percent. Since hemoglobin has a greater affinity to CO than oxygen the breath-hold time can be only 10 seconds, which is a sufficient amount of time for this transfer of CO to occur. Since the inhaled amount of CO is known, the exhaled CO is subtracted to determine the amount transferred during the breath-hold time. The tracer gas is analyzed simultaneously with CO to determine the distribution of the test gas mixture. This test will pick up diffusion impairments, for instance in pulmonary fibrosis. This must be corrected for anemia (a low hemoglobin concentration will reduce DLCO) and pulmonary hemorrhage (excess RBC's in the interstitium or alveoli can absorb CO and artificially increase the DLCO capacity). Atmospheric pressure and/or altitude will also affect measured DLCO, and so a correction factor is needed to adjust for standard pressure.

=== Maximum voluntary ventilation (MVV) ===
Maximum voluntary ventilation (MVV) is a measure of the maximum amount of air that can be inhaled and exhaled within one minute. For the comfort of the patient this is done over a 15-second time period before being extrapolated to a value for one minute expressed as liters/minute. Average values for males and females are 140–180 and 80–120 liters per minute respectively.

=== Static lung compliance (C_{st}) ===
When estimating static lung compliance, volume measurements by the spirometer needs to be complemented by pressure transducers in order to simultaneously measure the transpulmonary pressure. When having drawn a curve with the relations between changes in volume to changes in transpulmonary pressure, C_{st} is the slope of the curve during any given volume, or, mathematically, ΔV/ΔP. Static lung compliance is perhaps the most sensitive parameter for the detection of abnormal pulmonary mechanics. It is considered normal if it is 60% to 140% of the average value in the population for any person of similar age, sex and body composition.

In those with acute respiratory failure on mechanical ventilation, "the static compliance of the total respiratory system is conventionally obtained by dividing the tidal volume by the difference between the 'plateau' pressure measured at the airway opening (PaO) during an occlusion at end-inspiration and positive end-expiratory pressure (PEEP) set by the ventilator".

Measurement	Approximate value	
Measurement	Male	Female
Forced vital capacity (FVC)	4.8 L	3.7 L
Tidal volume (Vt)	500 mL	390 mL
Total lung capacity (TLC)	6.0 L	4.7 L

=== Others ===
Forced Expiratory Time (FET)
Forced Expiratory Time (FET) measures the length of the expiration in seconds.

Slow vital capacity (SVC)
Slow vital capacity (SVC) is the maximum volume of air that can be exhaled slowly after slow maximum inhalation.

Maximal pressure (P_{max} and P_{i})

Spirometer - ERV in cc (cm^{3}) average Age 20
Male	Female
4320	3387

P_{max} is the asymptotically maximal pressure that can be developed by the respiratory muscles at any lung volume and P_{i} is the maximum inspiratory pressure that can be developed at specific lung volumes. This measurement also requires pressure transducers in addition. It is considered normal if it is 60% to 140% of the average value in the population for any person of similar age, sex and body composition. A derived parameter is the coefficient of retraction (CR) which is P_{max}/TLC .

Mean transit time (MTT)
Mean transit time is the area under the flow-volume curve divided by the forced vital capacity.

Maximal inspiratory pressure (MIP) MIP, also known as negative inspiratory force (NIF), is the maximum pressure that can be generated against an occluded airway beginning at functional residual capacity (FRC). It is a marker of respiratory muscle function and strength. Represented by centimeters of water pressure (cmH2O) and measured with a manometer. Maximum inspiratory pressure is an important and noninvasive index of diaphragm strength and an independent tool for diagnosing many illnesses. Typical maximum inspiratory pressures in adult males can be estimated from the equation, M_{IP} = 142 - (1.03 x Age) cmH_{2}O, where age is in years.

== Technologies used in spirometers ==
- Volumetric Spirometers
  - Water bell
  - Bellows wedge
- Flow measuring Spirometers
  - Fleisch-pneumotach
  - Lilly (screen) pneumotach
  - Turbine/Stator Rotor (normally incorrectly referred to as a turbine. Actually a rotating vane which spins because of the air flow generated by the subject. The revolutions of the vane are counted as they break a light beam)
  - Pitot tube
  - Hot-wire anemometer
  - Ultrasound

== See also ==
- Anaesthesiology
- Peak flow meter
- Nitrogen washout
