= Extrapulmonary restriction =

- Specialty: Pulmonology

Extrapulmonary restriction is a type of restrictive lung disease, indicated by decreased alveolar ventilation with accompanying hypercapnia. It is characterized as an inhibition to the drive to breathe, or an ineffective restoration of the drive to breathe.

Extrapulmonary restriction can be caused by central and peripheral nervous system dysfunctions, over-sedation, or trauma (such as a broken rib).
