= Martin Wright (bioengineer) =

British bioengineer (1912–2001)

Basil Martin Wright (20 December 1912 – 4 March 2001) was a British bioengineer who invented several notable medical instruments, including the peak flow meter and syringe driver. The "alcolmeter" he developed won a Queen's Award for Industry and is the breathalyser most often used at the road-side in the United Kingdom.

== Early life ==
Wright was born in Dulwich, the son of a clergyman of the Church of England, and was educated at Winchester College and Trinity College, Cambridge, where he graduated with a first in physiology. He then proceeded to St Bartholomew's Hospital and qualified as a doctor in 1938.

== Career ==
After his time at Bart's as a medical registrar, in 1942 Wright joined the Royal Army Medical Corps to work as a pathologist. During the Second World War he was posted to Sierra Leone, and after the war to Singapore, where he organized the reinstatement of medical laboratory services. He rose to the rank of Colonel, and after demobilization continued to work as a pathologist, before joining the Medical Research Council for a new unit at Llandaff Hospital studying pneumoconiosis. The unit needed equipment which did not then exist, and Wright developed it himself. To measure lung function, in 1956 he invented the peak flow meter. After the research unit's results were published in 1959, "peak flow" became a standard measure of respiratory function for most lung diseases. Millions of peak flow meters have since been produced.

Wright went on to develop several other medical innovations.
