= Post bronchodilator test =

- Purpose: assess reversibility of bronchoconstriction

The post bronchodilator test (Post BD), also commonly referred to as a reversibility test, is a test that utilizes spirometry to assess possible reversibility of bronchoconstriction in diseases such as asthma.

== Indications ==
This procedure is indicated in the diagnosis and follow-up of asthma, and in the differentiation between asthma and COPD.

== Procedure ==
An initial spirometry is performed to assess the patient's native respiratory status. The patient will be asked to take a deep breath and then blow into the mouthpiece of the spirometer as hard as you can. This is a baseline measurement. A dose of bronchodilator medication is administered by means of inhaler or nebulizer (such as 400mcg of salbutamol (also known as albuterol)). You will wait about 15 minutes and then the spirometry is repeated. An increase in FEV1 (or forced expiratory volume in the first second of a forced exhalation) of >200ml is considered a positive result. Bear in mind, however, that this number does not apply to children, and that it can differ depending on the patient's native result; small patient's with pulmonary fibrosis, restrictive lung disease etc. will have a measurably lower FEV1 than healthy average-sized adults. This can give a false positive result of the test.
