= Diffusing capacity =

Measure of the transfer of gas from the lung to red blood cells

- MeSH: D011653
- Other codes: CPT: 94720

Diffusing capacity of the lung (D_{L}) (also known as transfer factor) measures the transfer of gas from air in the lung, to the red blood cells in lung blood vessels. It is part of a comprehensive series of pulmonary function tests to determine the overall ability of the lung to transport gas into and out of the blood. D_{L}, especially D_{LCO}, is reduced in certain diseases of the lung and heart. D_{LCO} measurement has been standardized according to a position paper by a task force of the European Respiratory and American Thoracic Societies. The Pulmonary diffusing capacity for nitric oxide (D_{L,NO}) is now also used.

In respiratory physiology, the diffusing capacity has a long history of great utility, representing conductance of gas across the alveolar-capillary membrane and also takes into account factors affecting the behaviour of a given gas with hemoglobin.

The term may be considered a misnomer as it represents neither diffusion nor a capacity (as it is typically measured under submaximal conditions) nor capacitance. In addition, gas transport is only diffusion limited in extreme cases, such as for oxygen uptake at very low ambient oxygen or very high pulmonary blood flow.

The diffusing capacity does not directly measure the primary cause of hypoxemia, or low blood oxygen, namely mismatch of ventilation to perfusion:

- Not all pulmonary arterial blood goes to areas of the lung where gas exchange can occur (the anatomic or physiologic shunts), and this poorly oxygenated blood rejoins the well oxygenated blood from healthy lung in the pulmonary vein. Together, the mixture has less oxygen than that blood from the healthy lung alone, and so is hypoxemic.
- Similarly, not all inspired air goes to areas of the lung where gas exchange can occur (the anatomic and the physiological dead spaces), and so is wasted.

== Testing ==
The single-breath diffusing capacity test is the most common way to determine $D_L$. The test is performed by having the subject blow out all of the air that they can, leaving only the residual lung volume of gas. The person then inhales a test gas mixture rapidly and completely, reaching the total lung capacity as nearly as possible. This test gas mixture contains a small amount of carbon monoxide (usually 0.3%) and a tracer gas that is freely distributed throughout the alveolar space but which doesn't cross the alveolar-capillary membrane. Helium and methane are two such gasses. The test gas is held in the lung for about 10 seconds during which time the CO (but not the tracer gas) continuously moves from the alveoli into the blood. Then the subject exhales.

The anatomy of the airways means inspired air must pass through the mouth, trachea, bronchi and bronchioles (anatomical dead space) before it gets to the alveoli where gas exchange will occur; on exhalation, alveolar gas must return along the same path, and so the exhaled sample will be purely alveolar only after a 500 to 1,000 ml of gas has been breathed out. While it is algebraically possible to approximate the effects of anatomy (the three-equation method), disease states introduce considerable uncertainty to this approach. Instead, the first 500 to 1,000 ml of the expired gas is disregarded and the next portion which contain gas that has been in the alveoli is analyzed. By analyzing the concentrations of carbon monoxide and inert gas in the inspired gas and in the exhaled gas, it is possible to calculate $(D_{L_{CO}})$ according to Equation 2. First, the rate at which CO is taken up by the lung is calculated according to:

$\dot{V}_{CO} =\frac {\Delta{[CO]} * V_A} {\Delta{t}}$ .	4

The pulmonary function equipment monitors the change in the concentration of CO that occurred during the breath hold, $\Delta{[CO]}$, and also records the time $\Delta{t}$.
The volume of the alveoli, $V_A$, is determined by the degree to which the tracer gas has been diluted by inhaling it into the lung.

Similarly,

$P_{A_{CO}} = V_B * F_{A_{CO_{O}}}$ .	5

where

$F_{A_{CO_{O}}}$ is the initial alveolar fractional CO concentration, as calculated by the dilution of the tracer gas.
$V_B$ is the barometric pressure

Other methods that are not so widely used at present can measure the diffusing capacity. These include the steady state diffusing capacity that is performed during regular tidal breathing, or the rebreathing method that requires rebreathing from a reservoir of gas mixtures.

== Calculation ==
The diffusion capacity for oxygen $(D_{L_{O_2}})$ is the proportionality factor relating the rate of oxygen uptake into the lung to the oxygen gradient between the capillary blood and the alveoli (per Fick's laws of diffusion). In respiratory physiology, it is convenient to express the transport of gas molecules as changes in volume, since ${V_{O_2}}\propto {n_{O_2}}$ (i.e., in a gas, a volume is proportional to the number of molecules in it). Further, the oxygen concentration (partial pressure) in the pulmonary artery is taken to be representative of capillary blood. Thus, $(D_{L_{O_2}})$ can be calculated as the rate that oxygen is taken up by the lung $(\dot{V}_{O_{2}})$ divided by the oxygen gradient between the alveoli ("A") and the pulmonary artery ("a").

$D_{L_{O_2}} =\frac {\dot{V}_{O_{2}}} {P_{A_{O_2}} - P_{a_{O_2}}} \simeq \frac {\dot{V}_{O_{2}}} {P_{A_{O_2}} - P_{v_{O_2}}}$	1

(For $\dot{V}$, say "V dot". This is the notation of Isaac Newton for a first derivative (or rate) and is commonly used in respiratory physiology for this purpose.)

$\dot{V}_{O_{2}}$ is the rate that oxygen is taken up by the lung (ml/min).
$P_{A_{O_2}}$ is the partial pressure of oxygen in the alveoli.
$P_{a_{O_2}}$ is the partial pressure of oxygen in the pulmonary artery.
$P_{v_{O_2}}$ is the partial pressure of oxygen in the systemic veins (where it can actually be measured).

Thus, the higher the diffusing capacity $D_L$, the more gas will be transferred into the lung per unit time for a given gradient in partial pressure (or concentration) of the gas. Since it can be possible to know the alveolar oxygen concentration and the rate of oxygen uptake - but not the oxygen concentration in the pulmonary artery - it is the venous oxygen concentration that is generally employed as a useful approximation in a clinical setting.

Sampling the oxygen concentration in the pulmonary artery is a highly invasive procedure, but fortunately another similar gas can be used instead that obviates this need (DLCO). Carbon monoxide (CO) is tightly and rapidly bound to hemoglobin in the blood, so the partial pressure of CO in the capillaries is negligible and the second term in the denominator can be ignored. For this reason, CO is generally the test gas used to measure the diffusing capacity and the $D_L$ equation simplifies to:

$D_{L_{CO}} = \frac {\dot{V}_{CO}} {P_{A_{CO}} }$.	2

== Interpretation ==
In general, a healthy individual has a value of $D_{L_{CO}}$ between 75% and 125% of the average. However, individuals vary according to age, sex, height and a variety of other parameters. For this reason, reference values have been published, based on populations of healthy subjects as well as measurements made at altitude, for children and some specific population groups.

=== Blood CO levels may not be negligible ===
In heavy smokers, blood CO is great enough to influence the measurement of $D_{L_{CO}}$, and requires an adjustment of the calculation when COHb is greater than 2% of the whole.

The two components of $D_{L_{CO}}$

While $(D_L)$ is of great practical importance, being the overall measure of gas transport, the interpretation of this measurement is complicated by the fact that it does not measure any one part of a multi-step process. So as a conceptual aid in interpreting the results of this test, the time needed to transfer CO from the air to the blood can be divided into two parts. First CO crosses the alveolar capillary membrane (represented by $D_M$ ) and then CO combines with the hemoglobin in capillary red blood cells at a rate $\theta$ times the volume of capillary blood present ($V_c$). Since the steps are in series, the conductances add as the sum of the reciprocals:

$\frac {1} {D_{L_{CO}}} =\frac {1} {D_M} + \frac {1} {\theta * V_c}$ .	3

Any change in $V_c$ alters $D_{L_{CO}}$

The volume of blood in the lung capillaries, $V_c$, changes appreciably during ordinary activities such as exercise. Simply breathing in brings some additional blood into the lung because of the negative intrathoracic pressure required for inspiration. At the extreme, inspiring against a closed glottis, the Müller's maneuver, pulls blood into the chest. The opposite is also true, as exhaling increases the pressure within the thorax and so tends to push blood out; the Valsalva maneuver is an exhalation against a closed airway which can move blood out of the lung. So breathing hard during exercise will bring extra blood into the lung during inspiration and push blood out during expiration. But during exercise (or more rarely when there is a structural defect in the heart that allows blood to be shunted from the high pressure, systemic circulation to the low pressure, pulmonary circulation) there is also increased blood flow throughout the body, and the lung adapts by recruiting extra capillaries to carry the increased output of the heart, further increasing the quantity of blood in the lung. Thus $D_{L_{CO}}$ will appear to increase when the subject is not at rest, particularly during inspiration.

In disease, hemorrhage into the lung will increase the number of haemoglobin molecules in contact with air, and so measured $D_{L_{CO}}$ will increase. In this case, the carbon monoxide used in the test will bind to haemoglobin that has bled into the lung. This does not reflect an increase in diffusing capacity of the lung to transfer oxygen to the systemic circulation.

Finally, $V_c$ is increased in obesity and when the subject lies down, both of which increase the blood in the lung by compression and by gravity and thus both increase $D_{L_{CO}}$.

Reasons why $\theta$ varies

The rate of CO uptake into the blood, $\theta$, depends on the concentration of hemoglobin in that blood, abbreviated Hb in the CBC (Complete Blood Count). More hemoglobin is present in polycythemia, and so $D_{L_{CO}}$ is elevated. In anemia, the opposite is true. In environments with high levels of CO in the inhaled air (such as smoking), a fraction of the blood's hemoglobin is rendered ineffective by its tight binding to CO, and so is analogous to anemia. It is recommended that $D_{L_{CO}}$ be adjusted when blood CO is high.

The lung blood volume is also reduced when blood flow is interrupted by blood clots (pulmonary emboli) or reduced by bone deformities of the thorax, for instance scoliosis and kyphosis.

Varying the ambient concentration of oxygen also alters $\theta$. At high altitude, inspired oxygen is low and more of the blood's hemoglobin is free to bind CO; thus $\theta$ is increased and $D_{L_{CO}}$ appears to be increased. Conversely, supplemental oxygen increases Hb saturation, decreasing $\theta$ and $D_{L_{CO}}$.

Lung diseases that reduce $D_M$ and $\theta * V_c$

Diseases that alter lung tissue reduce both $D_M$ and $\theta * V_c$ to a variable extent, and so decrease $D_{L_{CO}}$.

1. Loss of lung parenchyma in diseases like emphysema.
2. Diseases that scar the lung (the interstitial lung disease), such as idiopathic pulmonary fibrosis, or sarcoidosis
3. Swelling of lung tissue (pulmonary edema) due to heart failure, or due to an acute inflammatory response to allergens (acute interstitial pneumonitis).
4. Diseases of the blood vessels in the lung, either inflammatory (pulmonary vasculitis) or hypertrophic (pulmonary hypertension).
Lung conditions that increase $D_{L_{CO}}$.
1. Alveolar hemorrhage Goodpasture's syndrome, polycythemia, left to right intracardiac shunts, due increase in volume of blood exposed to inspired gas.
2. Asthma due to better perfusion of apices of lung. This is caused by increase in pulmonary arterial pressure and/or due to more negative pleural pressure generated during inspiration due to bronchial narrowing.

== History ==
In one sense, it is remarkable that DL_{CO} has retained such clinical utility. The technique was invented to settle one of the great controversies of pulmonary physiology a century ago, namely the question of whether oxygen and the other gases were actively transported into and out of the blood by the lung, or whether gas molecules diffused passively. Remarkable too is the fact that both sides used the technique to gain evidence for their respective hypotheses. To begin with, Christian Bohr invented the technique, using a protocol analogous to the steady state diffusion capacity for carbon monoxide, and concluded that oxygen was actively transported into the lung. His student, August Krogh developed the single breath diffusion capacity technique along with his wife Marie, and convincingly demonstrated that gasses diffuse passively, a finding that led to the demonstration that capillaries in the blood were recruited into use as needed – a Nobel Prize–winning idea.

== See also ==
- DLCO
