= Bronchial hyperresponsiveness =

Related to the physiology and pathology of asthma

Bronchial hyperresponsiveness (or other combinations with airway or hyperreactivity, BH used as a general abbreviation) is a state characterised by easily triggered bronchospasm (contraction of the bronchioles or small airways).

Bronchial hyperresponsiveness can be assessed with a bronchial challenge test. This most often uses products like methacholine or histamine. These chemicals trigger bronchospasm in normal individuals as well, but people with bronchial hyperresponsiveness have a lower threshold.

Bronchial hyperresponsiveness is a hallmark of asthma but also occurs frequently in people with chronic obstructive pulmonary disease (COPD). In the Lung Health Study, bronchial hyperresponsiveness was present in approximately two-thirds of patients with non-severe COPD, and this predicted lung function decline independently of other factors. In asthma it tends to be reversible with bronchodilator therapy, while this is not the case in COPD.

Bronchial hyperresponsiveness has been associated with gas cooking among subjects with the GSTM1 null genotype.
