= Methacholine =

Chemical compound

Clinical data
- Trade names: Provocholine
- AHFS/Drugs.com: Consumer Drug Information
- License data: US DailyMed: Methacholine
- Routes of administration: Respiratory
- ATC code: V04CX03 (WHO)

Legal status
- Legal status: AU: S4 (Prescription only); US: ℞-only

Identifiers
- IUPAC name: 2-(Acetyloxy)-N,N,N-trimethylpropan-1-aminium
- CAS Number: 55-92-5 62-51-1 (chloride)
- PubChem CID: 6114
- DrugBank: DB06709
- ChemSpider: 5888
- UNII: 03V657ZD3V
- KEGG: D04970
- ChEBI: CHEBI:50142
- ChEMBL: ChEMBL978
- CompTox Dashboard (EPA): DTXSID2046967

Chemical and physical data
- Formula: C_{8}H_{18}NO_{2}^{+}
- Molar mass: 160.237 g·mol^{−1}
- 3D model (JSmol): Interactive image
- SMILES: [Cl-].O=C(OC(C)C[N+](C)(C)C)C
- InChI: InChI=1S/C8H18NO2.ClH/c1-7(11-8(2)10)6-9(3,4)5;/h7H,6H2,1-5H3;1H/q+1;/p-1; Key:JHPHVAVFUYTVCL-UHFFFAOYSA-M

Methacholine (INN, USAN) (trade name Provocholine), also known as acetyl-β-methylcholine, is a synthetic choline ester that acts as a non-selective muscarinic receptor agonist in the parasympathetic nervous system.

== Medical uses ==
Methacholine is primarily used to diagnose bronchial hyperreactivity, which is the hallmark of asthma and also occurs in chronic obstructive pulmonary disease. This is accomplished through the bronchial challenge test, or methacholine challenge, in which a subject inhales aerosolized methacholine, leading to bronchoconstriction. Other therapeutic uses are limited by its adverse cardiovascular effects, such as bradycardia and hypotension, which arise from its function as a cholinomimetic.

== Pharmacology ==
It is highly active at all of the muscarinic receptors, but has little effect on the nicotinic receptors. Methacholine has a charged quaternary amine structure, rendering it insoluble in lipid cell membranes. Clinically, this means that it will not cross the blood–brain barrier and has poor absorption from the gastrointestinal tract. It is broken down at a relatively slow rate within the body, due to its relative resistance to acetylcholinesterases.

The chemical structure of methacholine is derived from acetylcholine by the substitution of a methyl group on the β carbon; this methyl group increases selectivity for muscarinic receptors over nicotinic receptors. The quaternary ammonium group is essential for activity.

== Contraindications ==
Use of methacholine is contraindicated in patients with recent heart attack or stroke, uncontrolled hypertension, known severe airway disease, or aortic aneurysm. It may be used with caution by nursing or pregnant mothers and patients taking certain medications for myasthenia gravis.
