= Pulmonary diffusing capacity for nitric oxide =

Pulmonary function measurement

- Synonyms: Transfer factor of the lung for nitric oxide (T_{L,NO})
- Purpose: Assesses the alveolar–capillary membrane diffusing capacity of the lung

The pulmonary diffusing capacity for nitric oxide (D_{L,NO}), also called the transfer factor of the lung for nitric oxide (T_{L,NO}), is a pulmonary function measurement that quantifies the rate of uptake of inhaled nitric oxide (NO) from the alveolar gas into the pulmonary capillary blood. It is expressed in units of mL·min^{−1}·mmHg^{−1} (traditional) or mmol·min^{−1}·kPa^{−1} (SI), with the conversion factor being division by 2.985. Because NO reacts with haemoglobin roughly 1,500 times faster than carbon monoxide (CO), D_{L,NO} is weighted toward the alveolar–capillary membrane component of gas transfer (D_{M}), in contrast to D_{L,CO}, which is dominated by the red cell or blood component (θ_{CO}·V_{C}). When measured simultaneously with D_{L,CO}, the combined single-breath D_{L,NO}–D_{L,CO} technique allows partitioning of total pulmonary gas transfer resistance into its membrane (D_{M}) and microvascular (θ·V_{C}) components using the Roughton–Forster equation.

The test was first performed in 1983 and has been the subject of a 2017 European Respiratory Society (ERS) technical standards document that standardised its measurement methodology, equipment specifications, quality control requirements, and reference equations for clinical use.

== History ==
=== Origins in Cambridge ===
Early research on nitric oxide in the United Kingdom was directed toward its toxicology rather than its physiology. In the late 1970s, "oxides of nitrogen" were suspected as a cause of lung disease from atmospheric pollution, indoor air pollution, and cigarette smoke. High concentrations of NO (over 100 parts per million) and lower doses of nitrogen dioxide (NO_{2}; 25 ppm) were known to cause lung damage in cases of accidental human exposure or experimental animal exposure. An emphysema-like lesion had been described in laboratory rats exposed to nitrogen oxides, fuelling speculation that these compounds caused emphysema in smokers.

At that time, the tobacco industry was under pressure to produce a "safer cigarette." To investigate NO in cigarette smoke, scientists at British American Tobacco constructed a prototype NO gas analyser based on chemiluminescence, a technique described by Brian Thrush and colleagues in 1964. The analyser generated ozone from atmospheric oxygen and reacted it with the gas sample; any NO was immediately converted to NO_{2} in an excited state, which emitted photons of light upon returning to the ground state. This highly sensitive and specific method has underpinned most subsequent work on pulmonary NO uptake.

Tim Higenbottam at Cambridge collaborated with British American Tobacco, who loaned him their analyser. Higenbottam and colleagues had previously failed to demonstrate a relationship between smokers' cigarette tar yields and airflow obstruction prevalence, and concluded that attention should be paid to the gas-phase constituents of smoke, principally CO and NO. Colin Borland's doctoral project was to compare NO and CO uptake using the chemiluminescent analyser for NO alongside a commercial infrared CO analyser with a helium analyser. He initially examined 40 ppm—a concentration he had (erroneously) calculated to be the alveolar NO level during inhalation of a popular UK cigarette brand. Borland found that NO uptake only occurred when volumes exceeding the dead space were inhaled.

The first measurements of D_{L,NO} (reported as T_{L,NO}) were presented by Borland, Chamberlain and Higenbottam to the UK Medical Research Society in Spring 1983. The suggestion to measure the transfer factor came from their technician, Andrew Chamberlain (subsequently Professor of Bioarchaeology at the University of Manchester). They found that K_{NO} (the rate constant for alveolar NO uptake) was highly correlated with but exceeded K_{CO} four- to five-fold, and like K_{CO}, increased with exercise. In a subsequent abstract, they calculated D_{M} assuming θ_{NO} to be infinite. The full paper, containing observations on varying breathhold time, undetectable back tension, greater volume dependence of D_{L,NO} than D_{L,CO}, and independence from hyperoxia, was published in 1989.

Regarding the original hypothesis, it is now considered very unlikely that NO in cigarette smoke causes emphysema: the half-life of oxidation of NO in air is approximately one hour, compared to roughly two seconds for alveolar uptake. Furthermore, histological NO_{2}-induced emphysema in rats differs markedly from smokers' emphysema, and large international differences in cigarette NO yields do not parallel emphysema incidence.

=== The French connection ===
The Bordeaux contribution arose independently, a positive side-effect of the May 1968 events in Paris. Professor Daniel Bargeton, Hervé Guénard's mentor, was vice-dean of the Paris medical faculty. When the university came to a standstill during the social upheaval, he returned to research and conceived the idea of calculating D_{M,CO} and V_{C} using two transfer gases in a single manoeuvre. He initially proposed using CO and hydrogen sulphide (H_{2}S), but this gas proved highly problematic: its odour was objectionable, it deposited sulphur in mass spectrometer ionisation chambers, and it was too soluble in water, disappearing rapidly into the airway walls.

After arriving in Bordeaux in 1979, Guénard systematically reviewed a list of candidate gases from a chemistry textbook. Sulphur compounds largely shared the same drawbacks; the list of nitrogen oxides was shorter, and the choice of NO was straightforward since other oxides such as N_{2}O_{2} and NO_{2} did not meet specifications. Guénard reasoned that the equation 1/D_{L} = 1/D_{M} + 1/(θ·V_{C}) could be solved by a single-breath manoeuvre using CO and NO simultaneously. The Bordeaux group published their formula for D_{M} and V_{C} from a combined single-breath D_{L,NO} and D_{L,CO} in 1987. Importantly, among their references was a 1958 paper by Carlsen and Comroe who had measured the rate constant for the reaction of NO with red cells in the absence of oxygen using the same rapid-reaction apparatus that Forster had used for CO.

Two other significant developments occurred in 1987: two independent groups proved that NO was identical to Endothelium-Derived Relaxing Factor (EDRF), enormously increasing scientific interest in NO; and Forster made further measurements of θ_{CO} at physiological pH, obtaining values that yielded slightly lower V_{C} and rather larger D_{M} compared to his 1957 data.

=== Evolution (1989–2016) ===
By the late 1980s, analysers capable of detecting NO concentrations down to 1 part per billion became available. This allowed detection of endogenous NO back tension at approximately 10 ppb, enabled longer breathhold times than 7.5 seconds, and permitted alveolar profile measurements using rapidly responding analysers for steady-state and intrabreath methods. Commercial gas transfer systems incorporating NO analysers also became available, using less expensive but less sensitive NO electrochemical cells that require shorter breathhold times.

Over the subsequent 25 years, numerous studies measured combined D_{L,NO} and D_{L,CO} in normal volunteers and in patients with a variety of cardiopulmonary diseases. Key findings included that D_{L,NO} increases more with lung volume than D_{L,CO}, increases linearly with exercise, increases at altitude in newcomers within 2–3 days (returning toward baseline by 7–8 days), and is reduced during diving while breathing oxygen.

=== The θ_{NO} debate: finite or infinite? ===
A central and ongoing debate concerns whether the specific blood conductance for NO (θ_{NO}) should be regarded as effectively infinite—meaning that D_{L,NO} equals D_{M,NO} directly—or finite with a meaningful blood resistance to NO transfer. The original Bordeaux assumption of infinite θ_{NO} was widely adopted by other investigators.

The Cambridge group challenged this view with a series of experiments. Using a membrane oxygenator model, they demonstrated that D_{L,NO} increased upon haemolysis, proving that blood resistance to NO transfer was significant in the oxygenator. They subsequently showed near-identical increases in D_{L,NO} with cell-free haemoglobin in both an in vivo canine model (using a bovine haemoglobin-based blood substitute) and their in vitro oxygenator, establishing that the resistance of blood to NO transfer was significant in the lung. Further work localised this resistance to the red cell interior specifically, rather than plasma or the red cell membrane.

The 2017 ERS Task Force established the current consensus that θ_{NO} should be taken as a finite value of 4.5 mL·min^{−1}·mmHg^{−1}·mL^{−1} of blood, as measured by Carlsen and Comroe in 1958.

== Physiological basis ==
=== Roughton–Forster equation ===
The uptake of both NO and CO from the alveolus to the capillary blood is described by the Roughton–Forster equation:

$$\frac{1}{D_L} = \frac{1}{D_M} + \frac{1}{\theta \cdot V_C}$$

where 1/D_{L} is the total transfer resistance, 1/D_{M} is the membrane resistance (from the alveolar epithelial surface to the red cell membrane), and 1/(θ·V_{C}) is the red cell or blood resistance. D_{M} is the alveolar–capillary membrane diffusing capacity, θ is the specific conductance of blood (the volume of gas taken up by red cells per mL of blood per minute per mmHg of partial pressure), and V_{C} is the total volume of blood in the lung capillaries exposed to alveolar air.

The chief barrier to CO uptake is within the red cell (approximately 70–80% of total resistance), with approximately 25% of resistance located in the alveolar membrane. For NO, the main resistance lies between the alveolar and red blood cell membranes (approximately 60%), with the red cell resistance comprising approximately 40% of the total.

=== Reaction of NO and CO with capillary blood ===
The reaction of haemoglobin in solution with NO is extremely rapid—nearly 1,500 times faster than with CO. Crucially, the reaction of NO with haemoglobin solutions is 500–1,000 times faster than its reaction with intact erythrocytes from animal or human sources, demonstrating that θ_{NO} cannot be "infinite." This red cell resistance was localised to the cell interior by experiments progressively converting oxyhaemoglobin to methaemoglobin by adding nitrite, which altered D_{L,NO}; by contrast, altering extracellular viscosity or comparing different erythrocyte sizes did not affect D_{L,NO}.

=== Alveolar–capillary membrane diffusing capacity and the α-ratio ===
The membrane diffusing capacity D_{M} encompasses the entire diffusion path from the surfactant lining layer through the alveolar epithelium, interstitium, capillary endothelium and plasma to the haemoglobin molecule. Its determinants are tissue diffusivity and the pressure gradient between alveolus and plasma. For a gas in tissue, diffusivity is the ratio of solubility to the square root of molecular weight. NO and CO have similar molecular weights (30 and 28 g·mol^{−1}), but NO has approximately twice the solubility of CO in tissue. The resulting diffusivity ratio D_{M,NO}/D_{M,CO} is generally taken as α = 1.97.

Thus, D_{M,NO} = α · D_{M,CO} = 1.97 · D_{M,CO}. This relationship, together with a finite θ_{NO} and an appropriate θ_{CO} equation, allows D_{M,CO} and V_{C} to be calculated from simultaneously measured D_{L,NO} and D_{L,CO} in a single manoeuvre.

=== NO in the gas phase ===
Airway uptake of inhaled NO in a single breathhold is negligible (approximately 0.02%). Within the acinus, the dominant mode of gas transport is molecular diffusion. Gas-phase diffusion coefficients are inversely proportional to the square root of molecular weight, so there is no significant difference between NO and CO. Gas-phase diffusion resistance as a proportion of total transfer resistance is greater for NO than for CO, but in normal lungs the effect is negligible (approximately 5% of total 1/D_{L,NO}).

=== Diffusion-limited uptake ===
Like CO, the uptake of NO is diffusion-limited rather than perfusion-limited. This is demonstrated by a very low D_{L}/(β·Q̇) ratio of approximately 0.012 at rest (where β is the capacitance coefficient and Q̇ is cardiac output), indicating that the diffusive conductance is the rate-limiting step in alveolar NO uptake. With exercise, this ratio decreases further since the increase in cardiac output substantially exceeds the increase in D_{L,NO}. A constant D_{L,NO} with 25-fold variation in blood flow in a membrane oxygenator model also supports diffusion rather than perfusion limitation.

== Time-based diffusion–reaction framework ==
An alternative to the classic Roughton–Forster resistance model was developed by Kang, Sapoval and colleagues, who solved the diffusion–reaction equations for simplified capillary–red cell geometries from first principles rather than treating the uptake process as a sum of independent resistances. In this framework, gas uptake is described in terms of characteristic times—an equivalent diffusion time for transport from the alveolar surface to the red cell membrane, and a reaction time for the intracellular haemoglobin reaction—rather than as a reciprocal sum of membrane and blood conductances. This approach was subsequently extended into a comprehensive model of acinar gas exchange during both breath holding and tidal breathing.

A central finding is that CO and NO exhibit fundamentally different capture mechanisms within the red cell. The penetration depth of CO—determined by the ratio of intracellular diffusivity to the haemoglobin reaction rate—is approximately 1 μm, comparable to the red cell half-thickness. Consequently, CO diffuses throughout the entire red cell volume before being bound, and D_{L,CO} behaves as a volume absorption process that scales with haematocrit and red cell volume. For NO, the haemoglobin reaction is so rapid that the penetration depth is only a small fraction of the red cell radius. Incoming NO molecules are captured almost immediately upon crossing the red cell membrane, and the interior of the cell contributes negligibly to uptake. D_{L,NO} therefore behaves as a surface absorption process, dominated by the accessible red cell surface area and the morphology of the membrane–plasma path between the alveolar wall and the red cell surfaces.

This framework also demonstrated that the two resistance terms in the Roughton–Forster equation are not fully independent: changing the membrane thickness in computational models altered the derived blood resistance, violating the assumption of strict series additivity on which back-calculation of D_{M} and V_{C} from the classic equation depends. Additionally, the conventional extrapolation of 1/D_{L,CO} to zero alveolar P_{O_{2}}—originally proposed to isolate the membrane component—was shown not to yield the true diffusive conductance, potentially introducing error into V_{C} estimates obtained by this method.

Clinically, the time-based interpretation supports treating D_{L,NO} and D_{L,CO} as two complementary but independent measurements rather than solely as inputs to a component-splitting equation. D_{L,NO} provides information about the alveolar membrane–plasma architecture and accessible red cell surface, while D_{L,CO} reflects red cell volume and haematocrit. Both measurements, together with V_{A} and the D_{L,NO}/D_{L,CO} ratio, can be reported as primary observables, with any D_{M} and V_{C} values flagged as model-dependent.

== Determinants ==
=== Lung volume ===
In normal subjects, D_{L,NO} decreases to a greater extent than D_{L,CO} when lung volume declines. Compared to 100% of alveolar volume (V_{A}), D_{L,NO} decreases by approximately 40% when V_{A} is halved, whereas D_{L,CO} only decreases by approximately 25% for the same reduction. Consequently, for the same decrease in lung volume, the percentage increase in K_{CO} (D_{L,CO}/V_{A}) is approximately double that of K_{NO} (D_{L,NO}/V_{A}), reflecting the greater dependence of D_{L,NO} on the membrane-to-volume ratio (D_{M,NO}/V_{A}) than on the capillary volume-to-volume ratio (V_{C}/V_{A}).

=== Blood flow and exercise ===
D_{L,NO} increases linearly with exercise intensity. In healthy subjects, there is a linear increase in D_{L,NO} of approximately 16–22 mL·min^{−1}·mmHg^{−1} for every 1.0 L·min^{−1} increase in oxygen uptake, or approximately 5–7 mL·min^{−1}·mmHg^{−1} for every 1.0 L·min^{−1} increase in cardiac output. Notably, D_{L,CO} correlates more tightly with cardiac output than D_{L,NO}, suggesting that D_{L,CO} is more sensitive than D_{L,NO} to alveolar microvascular recruitment. Both D_{L,NO} and D_{L,CO} are impaired for several hours following strenuous exercise, likely due to mild interstitial pulmonary oedema and/or reduced pulmonary capillary blood volume.

=== Posture ===
After adjusting for postural changes in V_{A}, both D_{L,NO} and D_{L,CO} increase approximately 5% from the upright sitting to the supine position, attributable to a roughly 13% increase in V_{C} when supine.

=== Altitude and diving ===
After 2–3 days at high altitude (4,400–5,000 m), both D_{L,NO} and D_{L,CO} increase at rest in healthy lowlanders. The D_{L,NO}/D_{L,CO} ratio falls acutely (by approximately 8%), returning toward baseline after a week. These changes are explained by alveolar expansion (weighted by D_{L,NO}) and capillary recruitment (weighted by D_{L,CO}) secondary to hyperventilation and increased cardiac output.

Diving has biphasic effects: both D_{L,CO} and D_{L,NO} increase transiently after short compressed-air or maximal breathhold dives due to pulmonary vasodilation and central blood volume shifts, followed by parallel decreases reflecting interstitial oedema and ventilation–perfusion mismatch. Longer-duration dives are associated with reduced D_{L,CO} owing to oxygen toxicity.

=== Back tension ===
Endogenous alveolar NO concentration is approximately 8–20 ppb during tidal breathing and approximately 100–140 ppb in the nose. Using inhaled NO concentrations of 40–60 ppm with a nose clip effectively eliminates back-tension interference. The presence of endogenous NO does not measurably affect D_{L,NO} or D_{L,CO}.

=== Heterogeneity ===
A drawback of the single-breath D_{L,NO} measurement is that the collected alveolar sample (500–1,000 mL) is not truly representative of the actual dispersion of function within even normal lungs. Ventilatory heterogeneity leads to underestimation of both D_{L,NO} and D_{L,CO} compared to the homogeneous situation. D_{L,NO} and D_{L,CO} both decrease as breathhold time is prolonged, because the decrease in K_{NO} and K_{CO} at longer breathhold times (giving more weight to slowly-filling compartments) outweighs the increase in accessible alveolar volume. Since D_{L,NO} and D_{L,CO} are similarly affected, the effect of heterogeneity on the D_{L,NO}/D_{L,CO} ratio is small in normal subjects.

== Clinical applications ==
=== The D_{L,NO}/D_{L,CO} ratio ===
As D_{L,NO} is weighted by D_{M} and D_{L,CO} is weighted by V_{C}, the D_{L,NO}/D_{L,CO} ratio reflects the relative change in membrane-to-capillary components of uptake (D_{M,CO}/V_{C}). An increase in the D_{L,NO}/D_{L,CO} ratio signifies a reduction in V_{C} that outweighs any reduction in D_{M}—that is, predominantly microvascular pathology. A decrease in the ratio suggests greater disruption of alveolar membrane structures relative to microvascular change. Since D_{L,NO} is relatively insensitive to haematocrit changes, the ratio should also rise in anaemia. The normal mean D_{L,NO}/D_{L,CO} ratio is 4.79 ± 0.40.

=== Microvascular disease ===
In pulmonary arterial hypertension (PAH), studies have shown a predominantly microvascular pattern, with a reduction in V_{C} greater than the reduction in D_{M,CO}, leading to elevated D_{M,CO}/V_{C} and D_{L,NO}/D_{L,CO} ratios. In liver cirrhosis with hepatopulmonary syndrome, a similar rise in the D_{L,NO}/D_{L,CO} ratio consistent with microvascular disease has been reported.

=== Interstitial lung disease ===
Results in interstitial lung disease have been variable, likely reflecting differences in pathophysiology and clinical stage. A greater reduction in D_{M,CO} than V_{C} (with a fall in the D_{L,NO}/D_{L,CO} ratio) was observed in sarcoidosis using a rebreathing technique, whereas the opposite pattern was found in diffuse parenchymal lung disease with PAH using a single-breath technique.

=== Airflow obstruction ===
In asymptomatic smokers without airflow obstruction (GOLD stage 0), D_{M,CO} was preserved relative to V_{C}, and the D_{L,NO}/D_{L,CO} and D_{M,CO}/V_{C} ratios were elevated compared to controls, suggesting that a reduction in V_{C} may be an early sign of chronic obstructive pulmonary disease (COPD). In established COPD, both D_{M} and V_{C} appear to be reduced.

=== Miscellaneous conditions ===
Reduced D_{L,NO} and D_{L,NO}/D_{L,CO} ratios have been reported in chronic renal failure (after adjusting for haemoglobin). In morbid obesity, there is slight reduction in D_{M,CO}/V_{C}. In cystic fibrosis, both D_{M,CO}/V_{C} and D_{L,NO}/D_{L,CO} are reduced. Following bone marrow transplant, both D_{L,NO} and D_{L,CO} are reduced.

=== Enhanced disease detection: the double diffusion advantage ===
A growing body of evidence from individual-participant data meta-analyses demonstrates that combining D_{L,NO} with D_{L,CO} improves the classification and prediction of cardiopulmonary disease compared with D_{L,CO} alone or either measure in isolation.

==== Heart failure ====
In a retrospective analysis of 140 patients with New York Heart Association Class II heart failure (ejection fraction <40%) and 50 controls, Zavorsky and Agostoni evaluated whether D_{L,NO} added predictive value to D_{L,CO} testing. Of 12 models evaluated using the Bayesian information criterion (BIC), the top two models were combined D_{L,NO} + D_{L,CO} z-score models. The highest Matthews correlation coefficient (MCC = 0.51) was achieved by combined z-score models, indicating moderate classification ability. Combined z-scores explained 32% of the variation in the likelihood of having heart failure, which exceeded the explanatory power of either D_{L,NO} or D_{L,CO} z-scores alone. While D_{L,CO} reflects predominantly pulmonary vascular and blood volume abnormalities (approximately 70–80% of the red blood cell barrier), D_{L,NO} captures the diffusion path between the alveolar–capillary membrane and the red blood cell membrane (approximately 60%); together, the two measurements sample complementary diffusion pathways.

==== Post-COVID-19 lung impairment ====
In an individual-participant data meta-analysis pooling data from 256 COVID-19 survivors and 76 controls across six centres in Italy, France, Spain and Australia, Zavorsky et al. assessed whether combining D_{L,NO} and D_{L,CO} enhanced detection of COVID-19-related lung pathology compared with D_{L,CO} alone or other standard pulmonary function measures. Among 256 subjects with complete pulmonary function testing post-COVID-19 (median age 60 years), 57% showed some form of impairment (airway obstruction, restriction, mixed disorder, or D_{L,NO} or D_{L,CO} below the lower limit of normal). Of 34 models evaluated, the model with the lowest BIC was a combined D_{L,NO} + D_{L,CO} z-score model, demonstrating superior COVID-19 detection. Five of the top nine models were combined D_{L,NO} + D_{L,CO} z-score models, and MCC values indicated that six of the top nine models were either combined or D_{L,NO}-only models. Dyspnoea severity correlated with combined z-scores (p < 0.001).

==== Emphysema in smokers ====
In a multicentre individual-participant data meta-analysis of 408 adult smokers (85 with CT-defined emphysema, 323 without) from three European hospital centres using a standardised 10-second breathhold double diffusion protocol, Zavorsky et al. evaluated whether D_{L,NO} z-scores outperform D_{L,CO} z-scores for emphysema detection. Among 34 candidate logistic models, the lowest BIC (164.6) occurred for a parsimonious three-predictor model comprising total lung capacity (TLC), forced expiratory volume in one second (FEV_{1}), and D_{L,NO} z-scores (Model C), with an 88% probability of being superior to the next-lowest BIC model. Discrimination was excellent (area under the receiver operating characteristic curve 0.97, 95% CI 0.95–0.98) and classification was high (MCC 0.80, 95% CI 0.69–0.89). Hierarchical partitioning showed unique contributions from FEV_{1} z-scores (R^{2} = 0.35) > D_{L,NO} z-scores (R^{2} = 0.21) > TLC z-scores (R^{2} = 0.11), totalling a McFadden's R^{2} of 0.66. Critically, adding D_{L,CO} z-scores to the D_{L,NO}-based model increased the total R^{2} trivially (by 0.003) and worsened BIC, indicating that the unique information captured by D_{L,CO} did not add a meaningful predictive signal for emphysema beyond D_{L,NO}. This finding is physiologically plausible: emphysema produces early alveolar–capillary membrane destruction, the compartment to which D_{L,NO} is preferentially sensitive.

==== Summary ====
Across these three disease contexts—heart failure, post-COVID-19 lung impairment and emphysema—D_{L,NO} consistently contributed independent predictive information beyond that provided by D_{L,CO}, spirometry or lung volumes. These findings support the recommendation that, whenever a D_{L,CO} test is clinically indicated and the necessary equipment is available, D_{L,NO} should be measured in the same manoeuvre and both values reported together with their ratio.

== ERS technical standards ==
In 2017, a panel of experienced physicians, physiologists and a technologist, funded by the European Respiratory Society, published a consensus document standardising the technique and application of single-breath D_{L,NO} measurement.

=== Gas analysers and equipment ===
All commercially available D_{L,NO} apparatus is based on the single-breath D_{L,CO} system with the addition of NO in the inspiratory gas mixture and an NO analyser. Because NO reacts with oxygen to form NO_{2} at a rate of approximately 1.2 ppm·min^{−1} (at 60 ppm NO in 21% O_{2}), NO gas is stored separately in a high-concentration cylinder with nitrogen (typically 400–1,200 ppm NO in N_{2}) and should be mixed with the remaining inspiratory gases no more than two minutes before use.

Two types of NO analysers are available. Chemiluminescence analysers are highly sensitive (detection limit 0.5 ppb, linear to 500 ppm, response time approximately 70 ms) but expensive. The less expensive NO electrochemical cell, used in most commercial pulmonary function systems, has a detection range of 0–100 ppm and a response time below 10 seconds. The lower sensitivity of the electrochemical cell necessitates a shorter breathhold time.

=== Testing technique ===
The D_{L,NO} test follows the general methodology of the single-breath D_{L,CO} manoeuvre. Subjects should refrain from smoking for 12 hours and from vigorous exercise for 12 hours prior to testing. After a period of quiet tidal breathing, the subject performs a rapid inspiration from residual volume to total lung capacity (achieving ≥90% of inspiratory vital capacity in less than 2.5 seconds) of a test gas mixture containing NO (40–60 ppm), CO (approximately 0.3%), an inert tracer gas (helium, methane or neon), and close to 21% oxygen. The breathhold time is 10 seconds when using a chemiluminescence analyser, or 4–6 seconds with an electrochemical cell. Following breathhold, the subject exhales smoothly and rapidly to residual volume.

An initial washout volume (0.75–1.0 L) of dead space gas is discarded, and a 0.5–1.0 L alveolar sample is then collected for analysis. Between successive tests, an interval of at least 4–5 minutes is allowed for elimination of prior test gases. The effective breathhold time is calculated using the Jones–Meade formula. The expired alveolar oxygen concentration should be measured so that θ_{CO} can be calculated from the alveolar P_{O_{2}}.

=== Calculations ===
The following consensus values are used for calculating D_{M,CO} and V_{C} from the simultaneous one-step NO–CO technique:

ERS Task Force consensus parameters for single-breath D_{L,NO}–D_{L,CO}
Parameter	Consensus value
θ_{NO}	4.5 mL NO·(mL blood·min·mmHg)^{−1}
1/θ_{CO}	(0.0062 · P_{A}O_{2} + 1.16) · (ideal Hb ÷ measured Hb)
Ideal Hb (males)	14.6 g·dL^{−1}
Ideal Hb (females)	13.4 g·dL^{−1}
D_{M,NO}/D_{M,CO} ratio (α)	1.97
Breathhold time	10 s (chemiluminescence) or 4–6 s (electrochemical cell)
Inspired NO concentration	40–60 ppm
Inspired O_{2} concentration	Close to 21%

The 1/θ_{CO} equation adopted was empirically derived by Guénard et al. from in vivo single-breath measurements at two alveolar P_{O_{2}} levels. This equation shows reasonable agreement with several in vitro–derived equations, including those of Roughton and Forster (1957), Forster (1987), and Holland (1969).

=== Quality control ===
The ERS Task Force specified the following quality control procedures:

Equipment quality control requirements
Item	Requirement
Analyser zeroing	Before each test; measure zero level after each test
Volume calibration	Daily, with a validated 3-L syringe (accuracy ±2.5%)
Leak testing	Weekly or whenever problems are suspected
Biological control	Weekly; a healthy nonsmoker whose D_{L,NO} and D_{L,CO} week-to-week should remain within 20 and 5 mL·min^{−1}·mmHg^{−1}, respectively
Linearity testing	Monthly, by serial dilution of known gas concentrations
Nonlinearity tolerance	≤1.0% of full scale for NO, CO, and tracer gas analysers
Drift limits (over 30 s)	≤10 ppm CO; ≤1 ppm NO; ≤0.5% tracer gas

=== Repeatability and reproducibility ===
Within a given testing session, two trials whose D_{L,NO} and D_{L,CO} differ by less than 17 and 3.2 mL·min^{−1}·mmHg^{−1}, respectively, are considered acceptable. Week-to-week or month-to-month reproducibility values for D_{L,NO} and D_{L,CO} are 20 and 4.9 mL·min^{−1}·mmHg^{−1}, respectively. A week-to-week change exceeding these thresholds has only a 5% probability of not representing a real change.

Importantly, D_{L,NO} shows a smaller percentage difference between intra-session and inter-session variability (15%) compared to D_{L,CO} (35%), suggesting that D_{L,NO} is a more stable measure over time and that the majority of its variability is within-session rather than between sessions.

No more than eight 5-second breathhold manoeuvres or six 10-second breathhold manoeuvres should be performed in a single session, to avoid excessive rises in carboxyhaemoglobin that could impair D_{L,CO} measurements.

== Reference equations ==
=== 2017 ERS Task Force equations ===
The original 2017 ERS Task Force reference equations were developed by pooling de-identified data from 490 healthy white adults (248 males, 242 females; age 18–93 years) from three published studies, with a mean breathhold time of approximately 6 seconds. However, approximately 75% of the pooled data in those three studies were collected using the Hyp'Air Compact device (Medisoft, Sorinnes, Belgium), and a 2021 randomised crossover study demonstrated that D_{L,NO} measured by the Hyp'Air was on average 24 mL·min^{−1}·mmHg^{−1} (17%) higher than by the Jaeger MasterScreen (Vyaire Medical), whereas simultaneously measured D_{L,CO} differed by only 1%. Because the 2017 equations did not account for the testing device, they may introduce systematic bias into predicted D_{L,NO} values depending on the equipment used.

=== Updated 2022 device-specific equations ===
In 2022, Zavorsky and Cao published updated reference equations by pooling de-identified data from five studies (530 females, 546 males; age 5–95 years; BMI 12.4–39.0 kg/m^{2}) measured on two commercially available devices: the Jaeger MasterScreen Pro (CareFusion/Vyaire Medical) and the Hyp'Air Compact (Medisoft). The study confirmed that the Hyp'Air Compact measured D_{L,NO} approximately 16–20 mL·min^{−1}·mmHg^{−1} (13–16%) higher and V_{A} approximately 0.2–0.4 L (6–8%) higher than the Jaeger MasterScreen Pro, whereas D_{L,CO} was similar between devices after controlling for altitude. Segmented (piecewise) linear regression equations with a single age-squared breakpoint were developed and shown to have similar prediction accuracy to generalised additive models of location, scale and shape (GAMLSS), as used by the Global Lung Function Initiative.

The segmented regression equations use age^{2} as the non-linear covariate, with two line segments connected at a single breakpoint (approximately 22–24 years for D_{L,CO} and D_{L,NO}; approximately 27–30 years for V_{A}). For each variable, there is an equation for the growth phase (below the breakpoint) and a separate equation for the decline phase (above the breakpoint). Height, altitude (for D_{L,CO}), and pulmonary function testing (PFT) device (for D_{L,NO} and V_{A}) are included as covariates where significant.

Segmented regression equations for D_{L,CO} in white subjects (age 5–95 years)
Sex	Age range	Intercept	Age^{2} coefficient	Height (cm)	Altitude (m)	Adj. R^{2}	RSE
Females	5.0–24.2 years	−11.82	+0.01534	0.183	0.0041	0.76	2.12
Females	24.3–95.0 years	−1.54	−0.0018	0.183	0.0041	0.76	3.13
Males	5.0–22.6 years	−15.22	+0.0323	0.206	0.0041	0.80	2.62
Males	22.7–95.0 years	+2.50	−0.00246	0.206	0.0041	0.80	4.35

Segmented regression equations for D_{L,NO} in white subjects (age 5–95 years)
Sex	Age range	Intercept	Age^{2} coefficient	Height (cm)	PFT equipment (Note: For the PFT equipment covariate, 1 = Hyp'Air Compact (Medisoft) and 0 = Jaeger MasterScreen (Vyaire Medical). The Hyp'Air Compact measured D_{L,NO} approximately 15–18 mL·min^{−1}·mmHg^{−1} higher than the Jaeger MasterScreen Pro.)	Adj. R^{2}	RSE
Females	5.0–22.5 years	−66.43	+0.0616	0.947	15.17	0.79	8.60
Females	22.6–95.0 years	−30.74	−0.00832	0.947	15.17	0.79	13.63
Males	5.0–22.1 years	−87.15	+0.1375	1.086	18.00	0.83	11.81
Males	22.2–95.0 years	−14.02	−0.012	1.086	18.00	0.83	19.25

Segmented regression equations for V_{A} in white subjects (age 5–95 years)
Sex	Age range	Intercept	Age^{2} coefficient	Height (cm)	PFT equipment (Note: For the PFT equipment covariate, 1 = Hyp'Air Compact and 0 = Jaeger MasterScreen. The Hyp'Air Compact measured V_{A} approximately 0.24–0.25 L higher than the Jaeger MasterScreen Pro.)	Adj. R^{2}	RSE
Females	5.0–30.2 years	−4.16	+0.00132	0.050	0.2545	0.80	0.39
Females	30.3–95.0 years	−2.79	−0.00018	0.050	0.2545	0.80	0.58
Males	5.0–26.9 years	−5.64	+0.00265	0.060	0.241	0.86	0.46
Males	27.0–95.0 years	−3.61	−0.00013	0.060	0.241	0.86	0.73

The lower limit of normal (LLN) is calculated as the predicted value minus 1.645 × RSE (corresponding to the 5th percentile). For example, a 27-year-old man, 180 cm tall, measured on the Hyp'Air Compact would have a predicted V_{A} of −0.00013·(27^{2}) + 0.060·(180) + 0.241 − 3.61 = 7.34 L, with an LLN of 7.34 − (0.73 × 1.645) = 6.14 L.

=== Classification of impairment ===
Zavorsky and Cao proposed a z-score–based classification system for the severity of diffusion impairment, applicable to D_{L,NO}, D_{L,CO} and V_{A}, since the percentage of predicted value corresponding to the LLN varies with age:

Classification of impairment in pulmonary diffusing capacity using the NO–CO technique
Category	z-score range	Approximate % predicted (± 3%)
Severe decrease	≤ −5.01	≤ 41%
Moderate decrease	−5.00 to −3.51	42–59%
Mild decrease	−3.50 to −1.645 (Note: For subjects with suspected or prior evidence of lung disease, the LLN is set at the 5th percentile (z = −1.645). For screening and case-finding purposes, the LLN is set at the 2.5th percentile (z = −1.96), in which case the mild decrease range becomes z = −3.50 to −1.96 (approximately 60–77% predicted).)	60–80%
Normal	−1.645 to +1.645	81–119%
Increased	> +1.645	> 119%

=== Applicability and limitations of current reference equations ===
Both the 2017 ERS and the updated 2022 reference equations were derived from white European and North American subjects. Genetic ancestry is an important covariate in D_{L,NO} prediction. In a pilot study of 59 healthy African American adults matched to white controls for sex, age and height, race accounted for approximately 5–10% of total variance in D_{L,NO} and D_{L,CO}; after controlling for other covariates, Black subjects had a D_{L,NO} that was 12.4 mL·min^{−1}·mmHg^{−1} lower and a D_{L,CO} that was 3.9 mL·min^{−1}·mmHg^{−1} lower than white subjects, with much of this difference attributable to a 0.6 L lower V_{A}. Using white-derived reference equations in Black populations risks falsely diagnosing lung disease.

In a larger study of 392 Mexican Hispanics (ages 5–78) compared with 1,056 white subjects, excluding race as a covariate increased the root mean square error by 61% for D_{L,NO} and 18% for D_{L,CO}; race-neutral equations produced false positive rates of 3–6% in Mexican Hispanics and false negative rates of 20–49% in white subjects relative to race-specific equations. Additionally, habitual residence at moderate altitude (2,240 m) increased D_{L,NO} by approximately 7 mL·min^{−1}·mmHg^{−1} and D_{L,CO} by approximately 4 mL·min^{−1}·mmHg^{−1} compared with sea-level residents, indicating that altitude should also be incorporated into reference models. Reference equations for other genetic ancestries and diverse geographic populations need to be developed.

Results should be presented as absolute values, percent predicted, and with the corresponding LLN, upper limit of normal (ULN), and z-score. Until between-device discrepancies are resolved by manufacturers, results should be interpreted using device-specific reference values.

== Limitations and future directions ==
Approximately 40 years after D_{L,NO} was first measured, five key challenges have been identified that must be addressed to move the test from a niche research tool to routine clinical practice.

Challenge 1 – A thin commercial ecosystem and regulatory inertia. Devices capable of simultaneous NO–CO measurements exist, but manufacturers are few and platforms differ in sensor technology (chemiluminescence, electrochemical, laser), response time, cross-sensitivities, calibration routines, gas mixtures and calculation algorithms. These differences shift absolute values and complicate portability of reference equations across devices. In the United States, the absence of Food and Drug Administration clearance for NO–CO systems and limited clinician awareness have further restricted D_{L,NO} to research use. Multi-site method-comparison trials that include device brand as a covariate, shared quality-assurance protocols, and regulatory-ready analytical validation packages are needed. Laboratories should explicitly report device brand, analyser type, software version and breathhold time in manuscripts and clinical reports.

Challenge 2 – Reference equations must account for altitude and genetic ancestry. Diffusing capacity varies across populations and environments. In Mexican Hispanics, habitual residence at approximately 2,240 m increased D_{L,NO}, D_{L,CO} and V_{A} compared with lowlanders, and models that included altitude and population terms reduced error and misclassification relative to race-neutral models. Complementary work argued specifically for race-specific D_{L,NO} equations to reduce false positives and false negatives in clinical practice. Where device- and timing-specific equations for particular populations already exist, laboratories should report z-scores that incorporate altitude and ancestry when they measurably improve calibration, and consider parallel reporting of race-neutral values when available.

Challenge 3 – Building global D_{L,NO} reference equations. The field needs multi-centre, multi-ancestry D_{L,NO}–D_{L,CO} datasets that explicitly encode device brand, altitude and breathhold time. A standing consortium could harmonise protocols, pool raw data and generate globally applicable equations with clear device and timing annotations. Current validated datasets exist for Mexican Hispanics, Black adults and white populations, but larger samples are required in Black populations and broader ancestry representation is needed to minimise misclassification and facilitate international adoption. A minimal data standard should include triplicate D_{L,NO}–D_{L,CO} manoeuvres with 5–6 s breathhold time, accepted quality criteria, haemoglobin values, body size, age and sex, and reporting of spirometry and lung volumes.

Challenge 4 – Two gases are better than one. Adding D_{L,NO} to D_{L,CO} materially improves case detection. An individual-participant data meta-analysis in heart failure found that the double-diffusion approach enhanced classification compared with D_{L,CO} alone. In post-COVID cohorts, the summed D_{L,NO} + D_{L,CO} z-score outperformed D_{L,CO} alone for identifying prior disease, and in smokers with emphysema, hierarchical partitioning showed that D_{L,NO} z-scores contributed uniquely to model fit beyond spirometry and lung volumes, whereas D_{L,CO} z-scores did not add further useful information. Whenever a D_{L,CO} test is clinically indicated and equipment is available, D_{L,NO} should be measured in the same manoeuvre and both values reported together with their ratio.

Challenge 5 – Reconciling component-splitting with time-based kinetics. Clinicians now encounter two frameworks for interpreting diffusing capacity. The classic Roughton–Forster framework treats total resistance as two serial terms—membrane (1/D_{M}) and blood (1/(θ·V_{C}))—and has been used for back-calculations of D_{M} and V_{C} from paired D_{L,NO}–D_{L,CO}. A time-based diffusion–reaction framework instead derives uptake from first principles as the sum of an equivalent diffusion time and a reaction time. Under this model, D_{L,NO} behaves as surface absorption dominated by the membrane–plasma path and accessible red cell surface, whereas D_{L,CO} behaves as volume absorption that scales with haematocrit and red cell volume. In clinical reports, it is recommended to present D_{L,NO}, D_{L,CO}, V_{A} and the D_{L,NO}/D_{L,CO} ratio as observables and to flag any D_{M}–V_{C} values as model-dependent.

== See also ==
- Diffusing capacity
- Pulmonary function testing
- Nitric oxide
- Carbon monoxide
- Roughton–Forster equation
- Exhaled nitric oxide
