= Peak expiratory flow =

Person's maximum speed of expiration

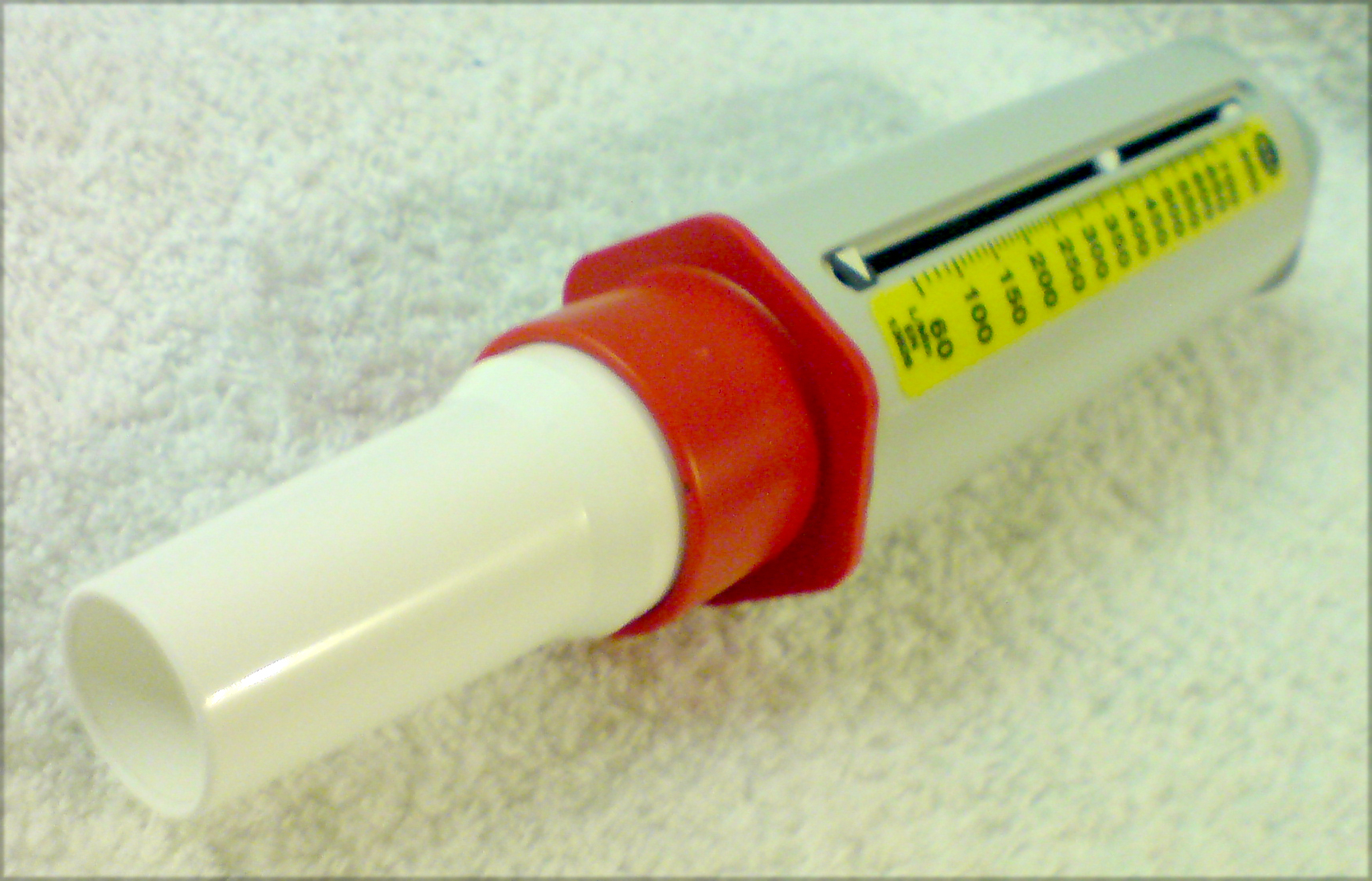
- A peak flow meter issued in Europe.
- MeSH: D010366

The peak expiratory flow (PEF), also called peak expiratory flow rate (PEFR) and peak flow measurement, is a person's maximum speed of expiration, as measured with a peak flow meter, a small, hand-held device used to monitor a person's ability to breathe out air. It measures the airflow through the bronchi and thus the degree of obstruction in the airways. Peak expiratory flow is typically measured in units of liters per minute (L/min).

== Function ==
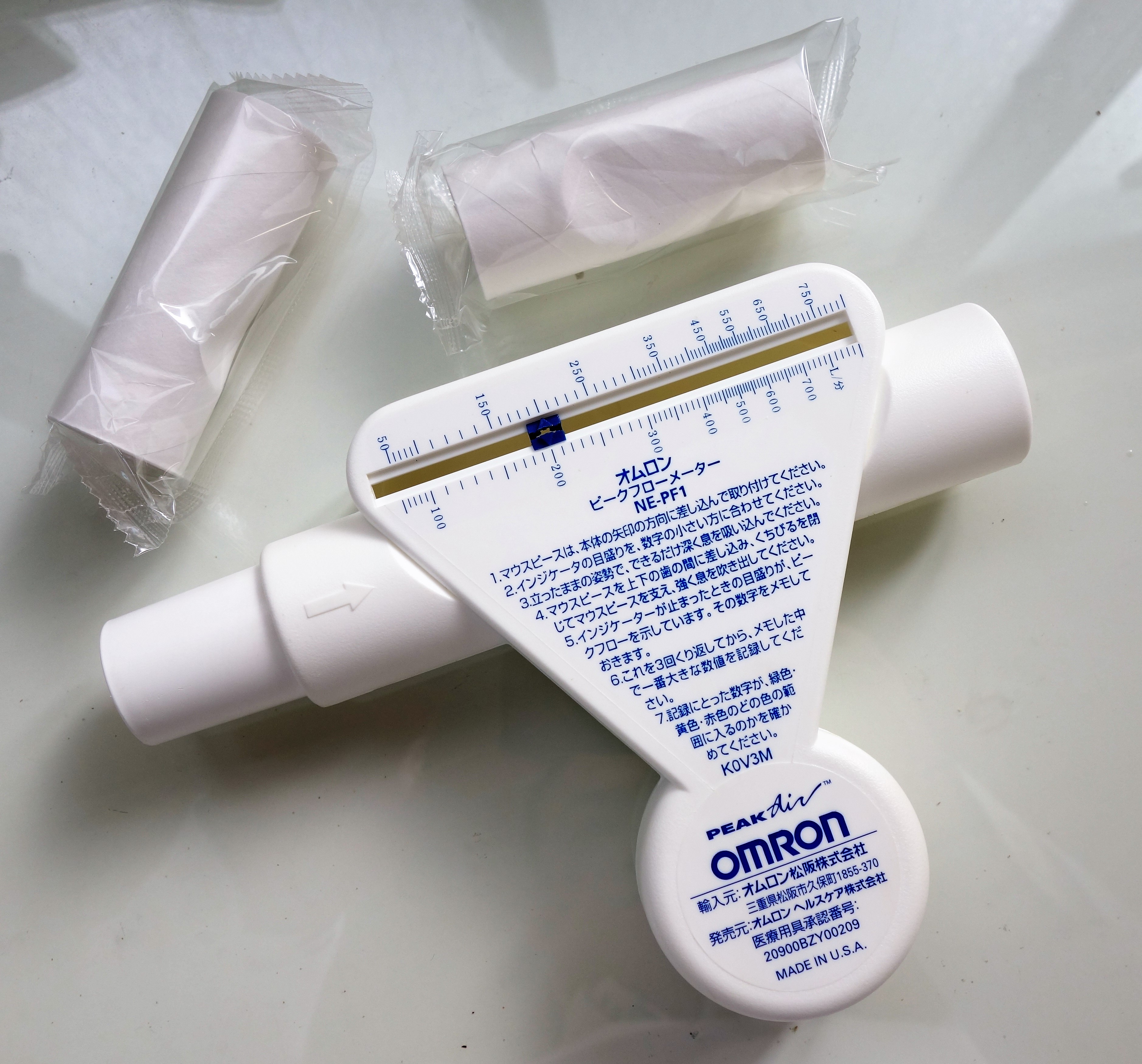
Peak flow meter (made in USA)

Peak flow readings are higher when patients are well, and lower when the airways are constricted. From changes in recorded values, patients and doctors may determine lung functionality, the severity of asthma symptoms, and treatment.

Measurement of PEFR requires training to correctly use a meter and the normal expected value depends on the patient's sex, age, and height. It is classically reduced in obstructive lung disorders such as asthma.

Due to the wide range of 'normal' values and the high degree of variability, peak flow is not the recommended test to identify asthma. However, it can be useful in some circumstances.

A small portion of people with asthma may benefit from regular peak flow monitoring. When monitoring is recommended, it is usually done in addition to reviewing asthma symptoms and frequency of reliever medication use.

When peak flow is being monitored regularly, the results may be recorded on a peak flow chart.

It is important to use the same peak flow meter every time.

== Scales or reference values ==
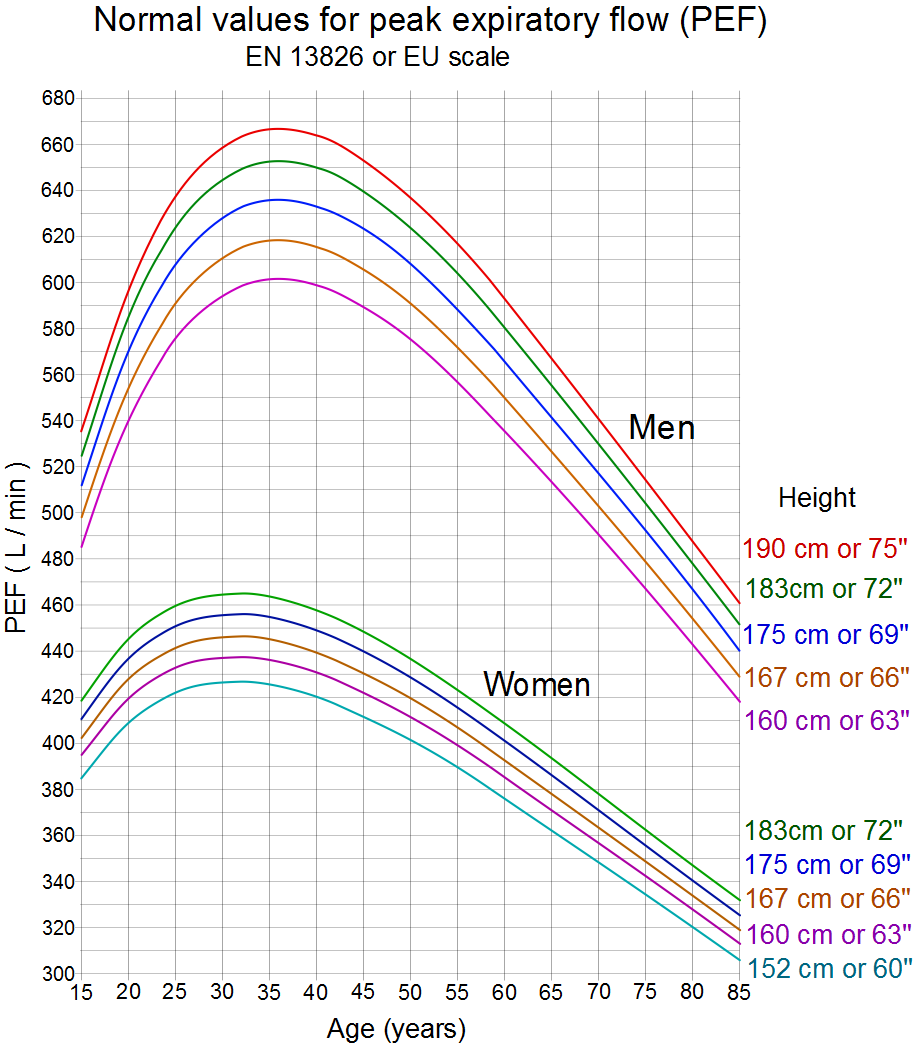
Normal values, shown on EU scale.

To interpret the significance of peak expiratory flow measurements, a comparison is made to reference (normal, predicted) values based on measurements taken from the general population. Various reference values have been published in the literature and vary by population, ethnic group, age, sex, height and weight of the patient. For this reason, tables or charts are used to determine the normal value for a particular individual. More recently, medical calculators have been developed to calculate predicted values for peak expiratory flow. There are a number of non-equivalent scales used in the interpretation of peak expiratory flow.

Some examples of Reference Values are given below. There is a wide natural variation in results from healthy test subjects.

- Wright scale
- EN 13826 or EU scale
- NHANESIII reference values provided by the US Centers for Disease Control (CDC)

In 2004 the UK switched from the original Wright scale to the newer, more accurate European scale. Wright values may be converted to the EU scale using the following formula:

$$\text{EU} {{=}} 50.356 + 0.4W + (8.814\times10^{-4} \times W^2) - (1.116\times10^{-7} \times W^3)$$

The reverse calculation is:

$$W {{=}} -61.1 + 1.798 \text{EU} - (1.594\times10^{-3} \times \text{EU}^2) + (7.713\times10^{-7} \times \text{EU}^3)$$

Where $W$ is the value in the Wright scale.

These formulas have also been trended over time in both rural and metropolitan areas both as air quality studies and as studies on asthma due to the Peak Flow measurement's accuracy as a predictor of mortality and poor prognosis.

== Measurement ==
Measurements may be based on 1 second or less but are usually reported as a volume per minute. Electronic devices will sample the flow and multiply the sample volume(Litres) by 60, divided by the sample time(seconds) for a result measured in L/minute : $\frac{\text{sample volume} \times 60}{\text{sample time}}$

The highest of three readings is used as the recorded value of the Peak Expiratory Flow Rate. It may be plotted out on graph paper charts together with a record of symptoms or using peak flow charting software. This allows patients to self-monitor and pass information back to their doctor or nurse.

Peak flow readings are often classified into 3 zones of measurement according to the American Lung Association; green, yellow, and red. Doctors and health practitioners can develop an asthma management plan based on the green-yellow-red zones.

Zone	Reading	Description
Green Zone	80 to 100 percent of the usual or normal peak flow readings are clear.	A peak flow reading in the green zone indicates that the asthma is under good control.
Yellow Zone	50 to 79 percent of the usual or normal peak flow readings	Indicates caution. It may mean respiratory airways are narrowing and additional medication may be required.
Red Zone	Less than 50 percent of the usual or normal peak flow readings	Indicates a medical emergency. Severe airway narrowing may be occurring and immediate action needs to be taken. This would usually involve contacting a doctor or hospital.

== History ==
The measurement of peak expiratory flow was pioneered by Martin Wright, who produced the first meter specifically designed to measure this index of lung function. Since the original design of instrument was introduced in the late 1950s, and the subsequent development of a more portable, lower cost version (the "Mini-Wright" peak flow meter), other designs and copies have become available across the world.

== See also ==
- Asthma
- Chronic obstructive pulmonary disease (COPD)
- Metered-dose inhaler
- Respiratory monitoring
- Salbutamol
- Spirometry
