= Restrictive lung disease =

Respiratory illnesses that restrict lung expansion

- Other names: Restrictive ventilatory defect
- Specialty: Pulmonology

Restrictive lung diseases are a category of extrapulmonary, pleural, or parenchymal respiratory diseases that restrict lung expansion, resulting in a decreased lung volume, an increased work of breathing, and inadequate ventilation and/or oxygenation. Pulmonary function test demonstrates a decrease in the forced vital capacity.

== Presentation ==
Due to the chronic nature of this disease, the leading symptom of restrictive lung disease is progressive exertional dyspnea. For acute on chronic cases, shortness of breath, cough, and respiratory failure are some of the more common signs.

== Causes ==
Restrictive lung diseases may be due to specific causes which can be intrinsic to the parenchyma of the lung, or extrinsic to it.

=== Intrinsic ===
- Pneumoconiosis caused by long-term exposure to dusts, especially in mining. For example, Asbestosis.
- Radiation fibrosis, usually from the radiation given for cancer treatment.
- Certain drugs such as amiodarone, bleomycin and methotrexate.
- As a consequence of another disease such as rheumatoid arthritis.
- Hypersensitivity pneumonitis due to an allergic reaction to inhaled particles.
- Acute respiratory distress syndrome (ARDS), a severe lung condition occurring in response to a critical illness or injury.
- Infant respiratory distress syndrome due to a deficiency of surfactant in the lungs of a baby born prematurely.
- Tuberculosis

Many cases of restrictive lung disease are idiopathic (have no known cause). Still, there is generally pulmonary fibrosis. Examples are:

- Idiopathic pulmonary fibrosis
- Idiopathic interstitial pneumonia, of which there are several types
- Sarcoidosis
- Eosinophilic pneumonia
- Lymphangioleiomyomatosis
- Pulmonary Langerhans' cell histiocytosis
- Pulmonary alveolar proteinosis

Conditions specifically affecting the interstitium are called interstitial lung diseases.

=== Extrinsic ===
- Nonmuscular diseases of the upper thorax such as kyphosis, pectus carinatum and pectus excavatum.
- Diseases restricting lower thoracic/abdominal volume (e.g. obesity, diaphragmatic hernia, or the presence of ascites).
- Pleural thickening.

== Pathophysiology ==
In normal respiratory function, the air flows in through the upper airway, down through the bronchi and into the lung parenchyma (the bronchioles down to the alveoli) where gas exchange of carbon dioxide and oxygen occurs. During inspiration, the lungs expand to allow airflow into the lungs and thereby increasing total volume. After inspiration follows expiration during which the lungs recoil and push air back out of the pulmonary pathway. Lung compliance is the difference of volume during inspiration and expiration.

Restrictive lung disease is characterized by reduced lung volumes, and therefore reduced lung compliance, either due to an intrinsic reason, for example a change in the lung parenchyma, or due to an extrinsic reason, for example diseases of the chest wall, pleura, or respiratory muscles. Generally, intrinsic causes are from lung parenchyma diseases that cause inflammation or scarring of the lung tissue, such as interstitial lung disease or pulmonary fibrosis, or from having the alveoli air spaces filled with external material such as debris or exudate in pneumonitis. As some diseases of the lung parenchyma progress, the normal lung tissue can be gradually replaced with scar tissue that is interspersed with pockets of air. This can lead to parts of the lung having a honeycomb-like appearance. The extrinsic causes result in lung restriction, impaired ventilatory function, and even respiratory failure due to the diseases that effect the lungs ability to create a change in lung volumes during respiration due to the diseases of the systems stated above.

== Diagnosis ==
In restrictive lung disease, both forced expiratory volume in one second (FEV1) and forced vital capacity (FVC) are reduced, however, the decline in FVC is more than that of FEV1, resulting in a higher than 80% FEV1/FVC ratio. In obstructive lung disease however, the FEV1/FVC is less than 0.7, indicating that FEV1 is significantly reduced when compared to the total expired volume. This indicates that the FVC is also reduced, but not by the same ratio as FEV1.

One definition requires a total lung capacity which is 80% or less of the expected value.

== Management ==
Medical treatment for restrictive lung disease is normally limited to supportive care since both the intrinsic and extrinsic causes can have irreversible effects on lung compliance. The supportive therapies focus on maximizing pulmonary function and preserving activity tolerance through oxygen therapy, bronchodilators, inhaled beta-adrenergic agonists, and diuretics. Because there is no effective treatment for restrictive lung disease, prevention is key.

== See also ==
- Chronic obstructive pulmonary disease
- Extrapulmonary restriction
- Obstructive lung disease
