= Pulmonary function testing =

Test to evaluate respiratory system

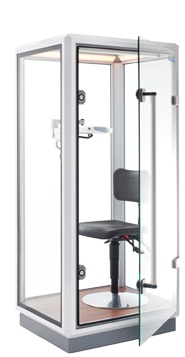
- Plethysmograph "body box"
- MeSH: D012129
- OPS-301 code: 1-71
- MedlinePlus: 003853

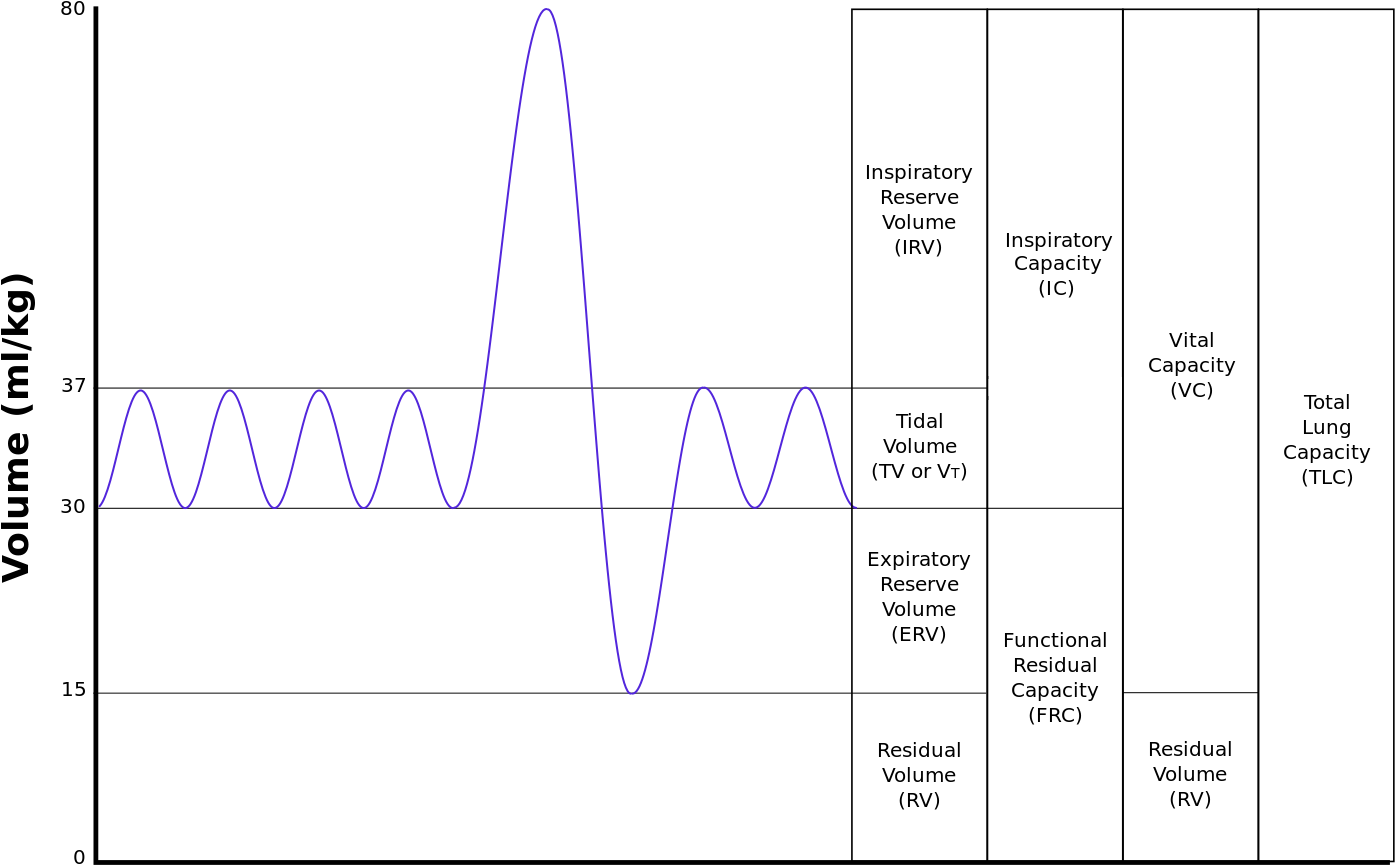
- TLC: Total lung capacity: the volume in the lungs at maximal inflation, the sum of VC and RV.
- TV: Tidal volume: that volume of air moved into or out of the lungs in 1 breath (TV indicates a subdivision of the lung; when tidal volume is precisely measured, as in gas exchange calculation, the symbol TV or V_{T} is used.)
- RV: Residual volume: the volume of air remaining in the lungs after a maximal exhalation
- ERV: Expiratory reserve volume: the maximal volume of air that can be exhaled from the end-expiratory position
- IRV: Inspiratory reserve volume: the maximal volume that can be inhaled from the end-inspiratory level
- IC: Inspiratory capacity: the sum of IRV and TV
- IVC: Inspiratory vital capacity: the maximum volume of air inhaled from the point of maximum expiration
- VC: Vital capacity: the volume of air breathed out after the deepest inhalation.
- V_{T}: Tidal volume: that volume of air moved into or out of the lungs during quiet breathing (VT indicates a subdivision of the lung; when tidal volume is precisely measured, as in gas exchange calculation, the symbol TV or V_{T} is used.)
- FRC: Functional residual capacity: the volume in the lungs at the end-expiratory position
- RV/TLC%: Residual volume expressed as percent of TLC
- V_{A}: Alveolar gas volume
- V_{L}: Actual volume of the lung including the volume of the conducting airway.
- FVC: Forced vital capacity: the determination of the vital capacity from a maximally forced expiratory effort
- FEV_{t}: Forced expiratory volume (time): a generic term indicating the volume of air exhaled under forced conditions in the first t seconds
- FEV_{1}: Volume that has been exhaled at the end of the first second of forced expiration
- FEF_{x}: Forced expiratory flow related to some portion of the FVC curve; modifiers refer to amount of FVC already exhaled
- FEF_{max}: The maximum instantaneous flow achieved during a FVC maneuver
- FIF: Forced inspiratory flow: (Specific measurement of the forced inspiratory curve is denoted by nomenclature analogous to that for the forced expiratory curve. For example, maximum inspiratory flow is denoted FIF_{max}. Unless otherwise specified, volume qualifiers indicate the volume inspired from RV at the point of measurement.)
- PEF: Peak expiratory flow: The highest forced expiratory flow measured with a peak flow meter
- MVV: Maximal voluntary ventilation: volume of air expired in a specified period during repetitive maximal effort

Pulmonary function testing (PFT) is a complete evaluation of the respiratory system including patient history, physical examinations, and tests of pulmonary function. The primary purpose of pulmonary function testing is to identify the severity of pulmonary impairment. Pulmonary function testing has diagnostic and therapeutic roles and helps clinicians answer some general questions about patients with lung disease. PFTs are normally performed by a pulmonary function technologist, respiratory therapist, respiratory physiologist, physiotherapist, pulmonologist, or general practitioner.

== Indications ==
Pulmonary function testing is a diagnostic and management tool used for a variety of reasons, such as:

- Diagnose lung disease.
- Monitor the effect of chronic diseases like asthma, chronic obstructive lung disease, or cystic fibrosis.
- Detect early changes in lung function.
- Identify narrowing in the airways.
- Evaluate airway bronchodilator reactivity.
- Determine whether environmental factors have harmed the lungs
- Preoperative testing

=== Neuromuscular disorders ===
Pulmonary function testing in patients with neuromuscular disorders helps to evaluate the respiratory status of patients at the time of diagnosis, monitor their progress and course, evaluate them for possible surgery, and gives an overall idea of the prognosis.

Duchenne muscular dystrophy is associated with gradual loss of muscle function over time. Involvement of respiratory muscles results in poor ability to cough and decreased ability to breathe well and leads to collapse of part or all of the lung leading to impaired gas exchange and an overall insufficiency in lung strength.

== Tests ==
=== Spirometry ===
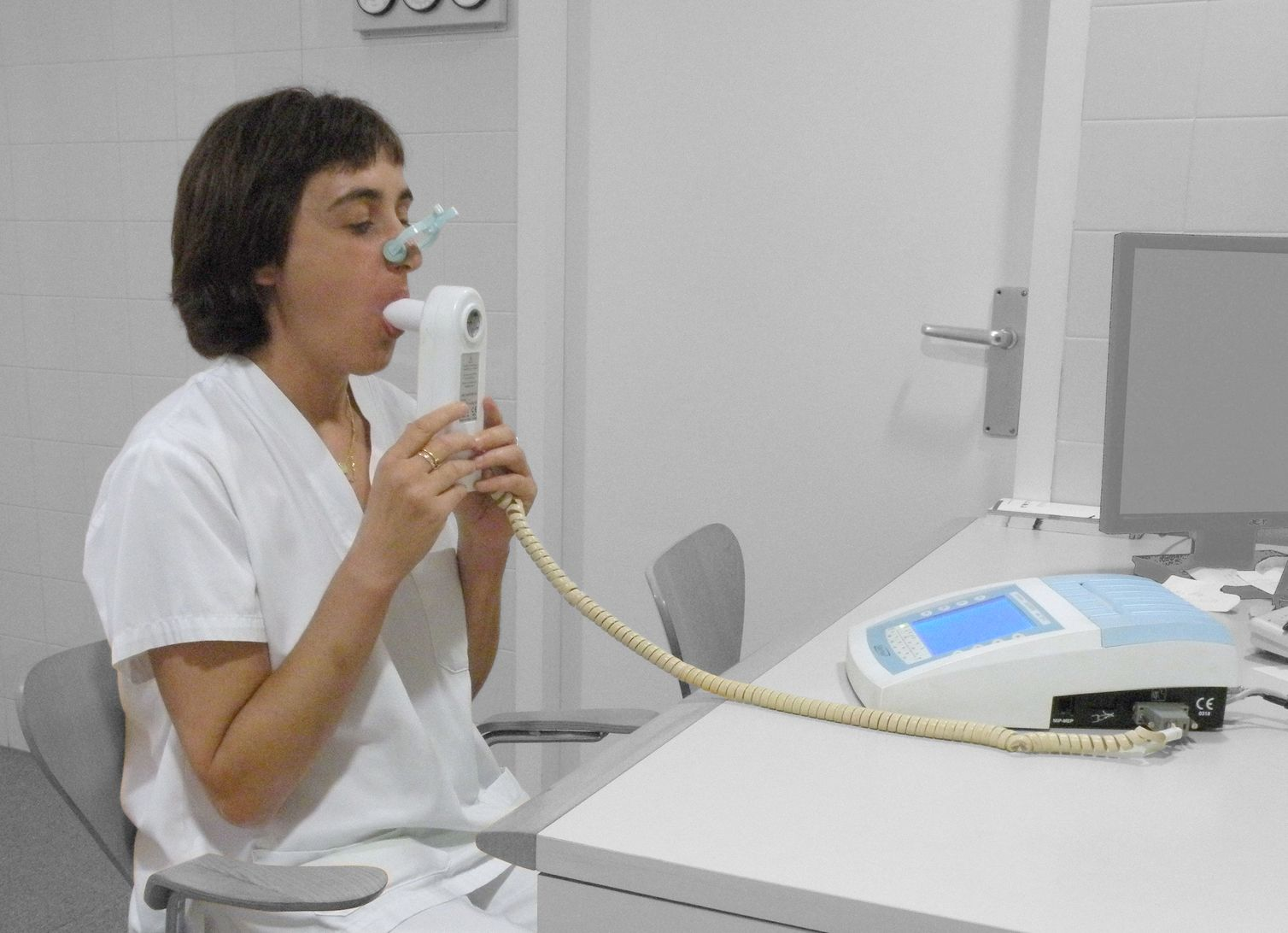
Spirometry

Spirometry includes tests of pulmonary mechanics – measurements of FVC, FEV_{1}, FEF values, forced inspiratory flow rates (FIFs), and MVV. Measuring pulmonary mechanics assesses the ability of the lungs to move huge volumes of air quickly through the airways to identify airway obstruction.

The measurements taken by the spirometry device are used to generate a pneumotachograph that can help to assess lung conditions such as: asthma, pulmonary fibrosis, cystic fibrosis, and chronic obstructive pulmonary disease. Physicians may also use the test results to diagnose bronchial hyperresponsiveness to exercise, cold air, or pharmaceutical agents.

==== Helium dilution ====
The helium dilution technique for measuring lung volumes uses a closed, rebreathing circuit. This technique is based on the assumptions that a known volume and concentration of helium in air begin in the closed spirometer, that the patient has no helium in their lungs, and that an equilibration of helium can occur between the spirometer and the lungs.

==== Nitrogen washout ====
The nitrogen washout technique uses a non-rebreathing open circuit. The technique is based on the assumptions that the nitrogen concentration in the lungs is 78% and in equilibrium with the atmosphere, that the patient inhales 100% oxygen and that the oxygen replaces all of the nitrogen in the lungs.

=== Plethysmography ===
The plethysmography technique applies Boyle's law and uses measurements of volume and pressure changes to determine total lung volume, assuming temperature is constant.

There are four lung volumes and four lung capacities. A lung's capacity consists of two or more lung volumes. The lung volumes are tidal volume (V_{T}), inspiratory reserve volume (IRV), expiratory reserve volume (ERV), and residual volume (RV). The four lung capacities are total lung capacity (TLC), inspiratory capacity (IC), functional residual capacity (FRC) and vital capacity (VC).

=== Maximal respiratory pressures ===
Measurement of maximal inspiratory and expiratory pressures is indicated whenever there is an unexplained decrease in vital capacity or when respiratory muscle weakness is clinically suspected. Maximal inspiratory pressure (MIP) is the maximal pressure that can be produced by the patient trying to inhale through a blocked mouthpiece. Maximal expiratory pressure (MEP) is the maximal pressure measured during forced expiration (with cheeks bulging) through a blocked mouthpiece after a full inhalation. Repeated measurements of MIP and MEP are useful in following the course of patients with neuromuscular disorders.

=== Diffusing capacity ===
Measurement of the single-breath diffusing capacity for carbon monoxide (DLCO) is a fast and safe tool in the evaluation of both restrictive and obstructive lung disease.

=== Bronchodilator responsiveness ===
When a patient has an obstructive defect, a bronchodilator test is given to evaluate if airway constriction is reversible with a short acting beta-agonist. This is defined as an increase of ≥12% and ≥200 mL in the FEV1 or FVC.

=== Oxygen desaturation during exercise ===
The six-minute walk test is a good index of physical function and therapeutic response in patients with a chronic lung disease, such as COPD or idiopathic pulmonary fibrosis.

=== Arterial blood gases ===
Arterial blood gases (ABGs) are a helpful measurement in pulmonary function testing in selected patients. The primary role of measuring ABGs in individuals who are healthy and stable is to confirm hypoventilation when it is suspected on the basis of medical history, such as respiratory muscle weakness or advanced COPD.

ABGs also provide a more detailed assessment of the severity of hypoxemia in patients who have low normal oxyhemoglobin saturation.

== Risks ==
Pulmonary function testing is a safe procedure; however, there is cause for concern regarding untoward reactions and the value of the test data should be weighed against potential hazards. Some complications include dizziness, shortness of breath, coughing, pneumothorax, and inducing an asthma attack.

== Contraindications ==
There are some indications against a pulmonary function test being done. These include a recent heart attack, stroke, head injury, an aneurysm, or confusion.

== Technique ==
=== Preparation ===
Subjects have measurements of height and weight taken before spirometry to determine what their predicted values should be. Additionally, a history of smoking, recent illness, and medications is taken.

=== Quality control ===
In order for the forced vital capacity to be considered accurate it has to be conducted three times where the peak is sharp in the flow-volume curve and the exhalation time is longer than 6 seconds.

Repeatability of the PFT is determined by comparing the values of forced vital capacity (FVC) and forced expiratory volume at 1 second (FEV1). The difference between the highest values of two FVCs need to be within 5% or 150 mL. When the FVC is less than 1.0 L, the difference between the highest two values must be within 100 mL. Lastly, the difference between the two highest values of FEV1 should also be within 150 mL. The highest FVC and FEV1 may be used from each different test. Until the results of three tests meet the criteria of reproducibility, the test can be repeated up to eight times. If it is still not possible to get accurate results, the best three tests are used.

== Clinical significance ==
Changes in lung volumes and capacities from normal are generally consistent with the pattern of lung impairment.

Spirometry is required for a diagnosis of COPD.

== Interpretation of tests ==
Classification of COPD based on spirometry
Severity	FEV1 % predicted
Mild (GOLD 1)	≥80
Moderate (GOLD 2)	50–79
Severe (GOLD 3)	30–49
Very severe (GOLD 4)	<30

Professional societies such as the American Thoracic Society and the European Respiratory Society have published guidelines regarding the conduct and interpretation of pulmonary function testing to ensure standardization and uniformity in performance of tests. The interpretation of tests depends on comparing the patient's values to published normals from previous studies. Deviation from guidelines can result in false-positive or false negative test results, even though only a small minority of pulmonary function laboratories followed published guidelines for spirometry, lung volumes and diffusing capacity in 2012.

=== COPD ===
The Global Initiative for Chronic Obstructive Lung Disease provides guidelines for the diagnosis, severity, and management of COPD. To determine obstruction in a patient's lungs, the post-bronchodilator FEV1/FVC needs to be <0.7. Then, the FEV1 percentage of predicted result is used to determine the degree of obstruction where the lower the percent the worse the obstruction.

=== Maximum respiratory pressures ===
Several calculations are needed for what a normal maximum inspiratory (MIP) and expiratory pressure (MEP) is. For males this found by:

$MIP=120-(0.41 \times age)$

and

$MEP=174-(0.83 \times age)$

To find the lower limit of what is acceptable in males the equations are:

$MIP_{LLN}=62-(0.15 \times age)$

and

$MEP_{LLN}=117-(0.83 \times age)$

For females, the equations are slightly different. For the normal values this is used:

$MIP=108-(0.61 \times age)$

and

$MEP=131-(0.86 \times age)$

For find the lower limit of what it should be without impairment this form of the equations is used:

$MIP_{LLN}=62-(0.50 \times age)$

and

$MEP_{LLN}=95-(0.57 \times age)$

where

- $MIP$ = maximum inspiratory pressure in cmH20
- $MEP$= maximum expiratory pressure in cmH20
- $MIP_{LLN}$ = maximum inspiratory pressure lower limit of normal in cmH20
- $MEP_{LLN}$ = maximum expiratory pressure lower limit of normal in cmH20
- $age$ = the patient's age in years
