= Endothelial dysfunction =

Impaired function of the inner lining of blood/lymph vessels

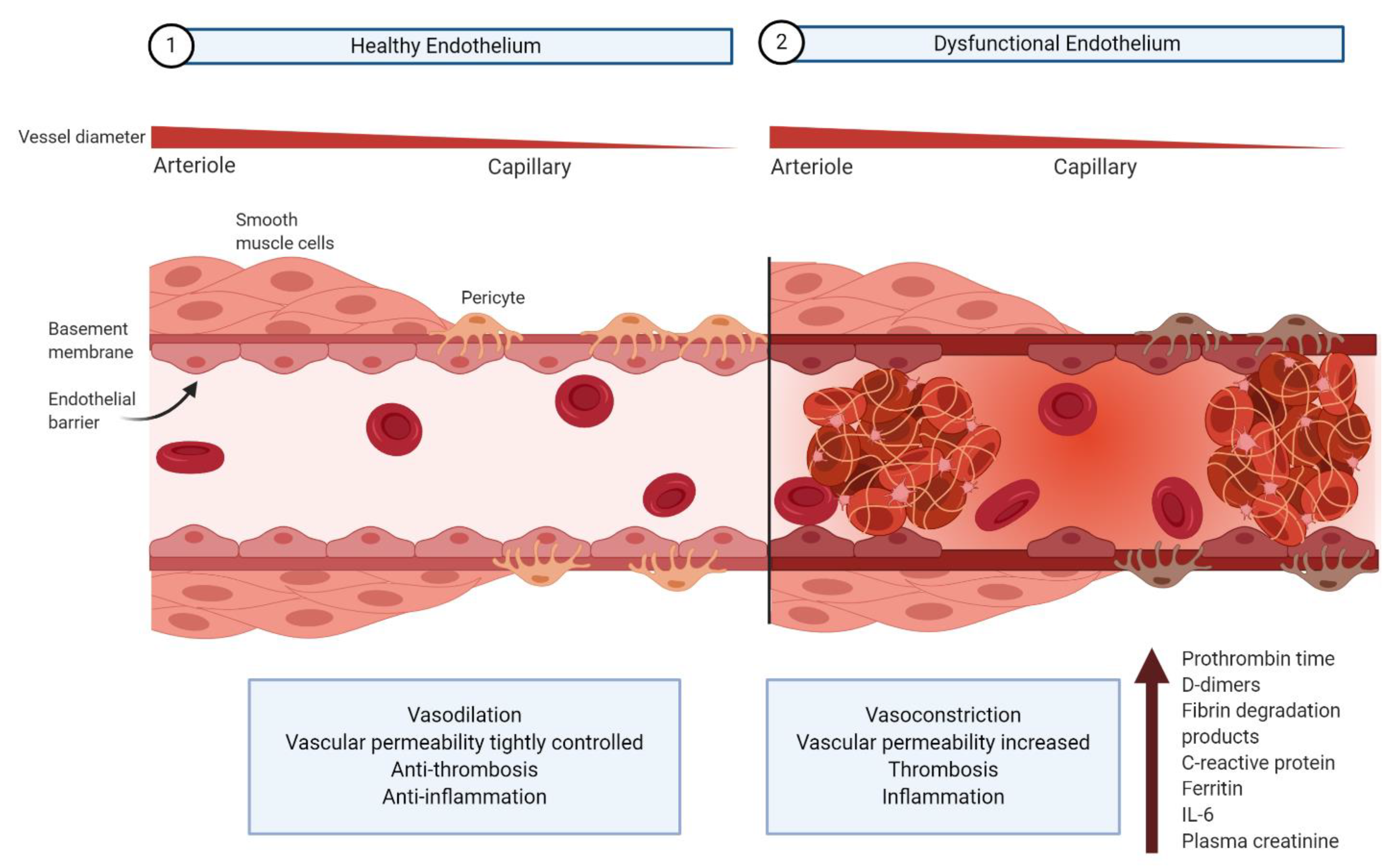
Comparison of healthy vs. dysfunctional vascular endothelium

In blood vessel diseases, endothelial dysfunction is an unhealthy state of the cells that line the blood vessels (endothelium). The main cause of endothelial dysfunction is impaired bioavailability of nitric oxide.

In addition to acting as a semipermeable membrane, the endothelium is responsible for maintaining vascular tone and regulating oxidative stress by releasing mediators, such as nitric oxide, prostacyclin and endothelin, and by controlling local angiotensin-II activity.

Dysfunctional endothelium is characterized by constricted blood vessels, increased ability of chemicals to flow through blood vessel walls, blood clots, and inflammation. This pathological state is often associated with elevated levels of biomarkers such as prothrombin time, D-dimer, von Willebrand factor, fibrin degradation products, C-reactive protein (CRP), ferritin, Interleukin 6 (IL-6), and plasma creatinine. The result of this endothelial dysregulation is a cascade of harmful effects, including tightened blood vessels, small blood vessel leakage, blood clots, high levels of inflammation, and a disrupted immune response against viruses. These changes contribute to the progression of blood vessel (vascular) diseases.

In a healthy state, the endothelium exhibits wider blood vessels, tightly-controlled blood vessel permeability, and anti-thrombotic and anti-inflammatory properties. This balance ensures the smooth functioning of the vascular system.

== Research ==
=== Atherosclerosis ===
Stages of endothelial dysfunction in atherosclerosis of arteries

Endothelial dysfunction may be involved in the development of atherosclerosis and may predate vascular pathology. Endothelial dysfunction may also lead to increased adherence of monocytes and macrophages, as well as promoting infiltration of low-density lipoprotein (LDL) in the vessel wall. Oxidized LDL is a hallmark feature of atherosclerosis, by promoting the formation of foam cells, monocyte chemotaxis, and platelet activation, leading to atheromatous plaque instability and ultimately to rupture. Dyslipidemia and hypertension are well known to contribute to endothelial dysfunction, and lowering blood pressure and LDL has been shown to improve endothelial function, particularly when lowered with ACE inhibitors, calcium channel blockers, and statins. Steady laminar flow with high shear stress in blood vessels protects against atherosclerosis, whereas disturbed flow promotes atherosclerosis.

=== Nitric oxide ===
Nitric oxide (NO) suppresses platelet aggregation, inflammation, oxidative stress, vascular smooth muscle cell migration and proliferation, and leukocyte adhesion. A feature of endothelial dysfunction is the inability of arteries and arterioles to dilate fully in response to an appropriate stimulus, such as exogenous nitroglycerine, that stimulates release of vasodilators from the endothelium like NO. Endothelial dysfunction is commonly associated with decreased NO bioavailability, which is due to impaired NO production by the endothelium or inactivation of NO by reactive oxygen species. As a co-factor for nitric oxide synthase, tetrahydrobiopterin (BH4) supplementation has shown beneficial results for the treatment of endothelial dysfunction in animal experiments and clinical trials, although the tendency of BH4 to become oxidized to BH2 remains a problem.

=== Testing and diagnosis ===
In the coronary circulation, angiography of coronary artery responses to vasoactive agents may be used to test for endothelial function, and venous occlusion plethysmography and ultrasonography are used to assess endothelial function of peripheral vessels in humans.

A non-invasive method to measure endothelial dysfunction is % Flow-Mediated Dilation (FMD) as measured by Brachial Artery Ultrasound Imaging (BAUI). Current measurements of endothelial function via FMD vary due to technical and physiological factors. Furthermore, a negative correlation between percent flow-mediated dilation and baseline artery size is recognised as a fundamental scaling problem, leading to biased estimates of endothelial function. Forearm plethysmography has replaced flow mediated dilation for assessing endothelial dysfunction. von Willebrand factor is a marker of endothelial dysfunction and is consistently elevated in atrial fibrillation.

A non-invasive, FDA-approved device for measuring endothelial function that works by measuring Reactive Hyperemia Index (RHI) is Itamar Medical's EndoPAT. It has shown an 80% sensitivity and 86% specificity to diagnose coronary artery disease when compared against the gold standard, acetylcholine angiogram. This result suggests that this peripheral test reflects the physiology of the coronary endothelium.

Since NO maintains low tone and high compliance of the small arteries at rest, a reduction of age-dependent small artery compliance is a marker for endothelial dysfunction that is associated with both functional and structural changes in the microcirculation. Small artery compliance or stiffness can be assessed simply and at rest and can be distinguished from large artery stiffness by use of pulsewave analysis.

=== Endothelial dysfunction and stents ===
Stent implantation has been correlated with impaired endothelial function in several studies. Sirolimus eluting stents were previously used because they showed low rates of in-stent restenosis, but further investigation showed that they often impair endothelial function in humans and worsen conditions. One drug used to inhibit restenosis is iopromide-paclitaxel.

=== COVID-19 complication in the lungs ===
COVID-19 can present with an acute lung injury manifestation that arises from endothelial dysfunction.

=== Risk reduction ===
Treatment of high blood pressure and high levels of cholesterol in the blood may improve endothelial function in people taking statins (HMGCoA-reductase inhibitor), and renin angiotensin system inhibitors, such as ACE inhibitors and angiotensin II receptor antagonists. Calcium channel blockers and selective beta 1 antagonists may also improve endothelial dysfunction. Lifestyle modifications such as smoking cessation have also been shown to improve endothelial function and lower the risk of major cardiovascular events.

== See also ==
- Atherosclerosis
- Endothelial activation
- Nitric oxide
- Endothelial nitric oxide synthase
- Prostacyclin
- Endothelium-derived relaxing factor
- Endothelin
- Integrin network
- Endothelial shear stress
