= Coagulation screen =

Combination of screening laboratory tests

- Purpose: initial broad categorization of haemostatic problems

A coagulation screen is a combination of screening laboratory tests, designed to provide rapid non-specific information, which allows an initial broad categorization of haemostatic problems.

== Process ==
The basic screen consists of:

- platelet count
- bleeding time for platelet function
- PR (prothrombin ratio) for the tissue factor pathway (extrinsic pathway)
- aPTT (Activated Partial Thromboplastin time) for the contact activation pathway (intrinsic pathway)
- TCT or fibrinogen assay for final common pathway (THROMBIN TIME)

Two other tests are regularly performed at the same time:

- blood count, to detect other hematological abnormalities
- liver function tests to exclude liver disease as a cause of coagulation factor deficiency

These tests may miss mild abnormalities but they will detect major disorders. The results of these screening tests, in conjunction with the clinical history (especially bleeding history), will then direct the selection of further, more detailed and specific coagulation tests, such as:

- specific factor assays, like fibrin degradation products, D-dimer, thrombin time, platelet aggregation, or
- specific factor inhibitor assays, like Protein C, TFPI, Antithrombin etc.
