= Hyperinflation therapy =

- Specialty: Pulmonology

Hyperinflation therapy (HIT) is a common therapy performed on patients who have some sort of respiratory distress. The therapy involves applying volumes greater than normal to reinflate the collapsed alveoli in the lungs. There are many different techniques used to administer hyperinflation therapy. The respiratory therapist typically decides which method is best for each patient.

== See also ==
- Pulmonary function testing
- Respiratory therapy
