= Residual volume =

In medicine, residual volume may refer to:

- Residual volume, air remaining in the lungs after a maximal exhalation; see lung volumes
- Residual volume, urine remaining in the bladder after voiding; see urinary retention
- Gastric residual volume (GRV) is the volume of food or fluid remaining in the stomach at a point in time during enteral tube nutrition feeding.
