= Positive health =

Positive health of a person is defined as the ability to live long in good health without activity limitation. This implies the availability of mechanism in the body to thwart the ailments and to minimize their adverse effect if they strike. The concept has evolved over time and has seen significant changes.

== History ==
The World Health Organization defines Health as a state of complete physical, mental and social well-being. This is a utopian and unattainable ideal as Moving the goalposts when an achievement is made. Possibly the first use of the term 'positive health' was in 1924 when it was considered a double positive as health itself is a positive term. In the year 2000, it was described as the ability to cope with biological, Psychological, and social stress, and parameters such as pain-bearing capacity and Vital capacity were suggested as its indicators. In 2008, positive health was explained as a combination of excellent status on biological, subjective, and functional measures, including factors such as optimism, stable marriage, and lower blood pressure level. In 2011, it was defined as one's ability to adapt and self-manage in the face of social, physical, and emotional challenges, and it constituted psycho-social parameters. In 2023, positive health was defined as the ability to live long in good health.^{[1]} An effort has been made to identify major indicators that can objectively measure a person's positive health in this sense.

== Domains and major indicators ==
Indicators of positive health generally include Life style (sociology) parameters such as social interaction, diet, physical activity, water intake, sleep and relaxation, and yoga and meditation. But most of these defy direct measurement. Such lifestyle factors modulate medical parameters such as Immunity (medicine) level and hormonal balance, and these parameters are objectively measurable. On the pattern of quality-of-life measurement, these parameters are divided into 5 domains, each comprising several parameters. The following domains and major parameters have been suggested to measure positive health.

Domain	Major parameters
Immunological markers	IgG, IgM, lymphocytes, macrophages
Nutritional elements	Various vitamins, zinc, Omega-3, glutathione
Endocrinological substances	Thyroid, insulin, estrogen, melatonin-serotonin-oxytocin-dopamine, Endorphins
Neurological parameters	Montreal Cognitive Assessment Scale, P3 amplitude, gamma-aminobutyric acid (GABA)
Physiological functions	Respiratory – FEV_{1}: FVC ratio, oxygen saturation Reproductive – M – semen quality and testosterone; F – FSH, LH, estradiol Gastrointestinal – ALT, albumin, lipid profile Circulatory – BP, heart rate, Hb, HbA1c, platelets Musculoskeletal – Bone density handgrip, body mass index Urinary – Protein-creatinine ratio, GFR, pH

== Measurement ==
All the major indicators mentioned in the table are numerically measurable in a laboratory or otherwise but, for many, high values are also injurious to health just as are low values. This affects the exact measurement of positive health. The optimal levels of most of these parameters are not known – thus a scale to exactly measure the level of positive health of a person is yet to be developed. However, there are parameters such as endorphins, semen quality in men, FEV_{1}/FVC ratio, oxygen saturation, bone density, P3 amplitude, and handGrip strength whose increased value progressively indicates a better positive health.
