= Respiratory inductance plethysmography =

Medical evaluation method

Respiratory inductance plethysmography (RIP) is a method of evaluating pulmonary ventilation by measuring the movement of the chest and abdominal wall.

Accurate measurement of pulmonary ventilation or breathing often requires the use of devices such as masks or mouthpieces coupled to the airway opening. These devices are often both encumbering and invasive, and thus ill suited for continuous or ambulatory measurements. As an alternative RIP devices that sense respiratory excursions at the body surface can be used to measure pulmonary ventilation.

According to a paper by Konno and Mead "the chest can be looked upon as a system of two compartments with only one degree of freedom each". Therefore, any volume change of the abdomen must be equal and opposite to that of the rib cage. The paper suggests that the volume change is close to being linearly related to changes in antero-posterior (front to back of body) diameter. When a known air volume is inhaled and measured with a spirometer, a volume-motion relationship can be established as the sum of the abdominal and rib cage displacements. Therefore, according to this theory, only changes in the antero-posterior diameter of the abdomen and the rib cage are needed to estimate changes in lung volume.

Several sensor methodologies based on this theory have been developed. RIP is the most frequently used, established and accurate plethysmography method to estimate lung volume from respiratory movements.

RIP has been used in many clinical and academic research studies in a variety of domains including polysomnographic (sleep), psychophysiology, psychiatric research, anxiety and stress research, anesthesia, cardiology and pulmonary research (asthma, COPD, dyspnea).

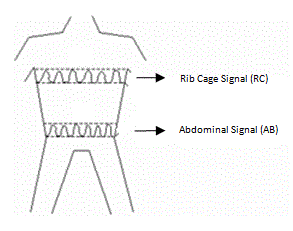
RIP Bands at Chest and Abdomen

== Technology ==
A respiratory inductance plethysmograph consists of two sinusoid wire coils insulated and placed within two 2.5 cm (about 1 inch) wide, lightweight elastic and adhesive bands. The transducer bands are placed around the rib cage under the armpits and around the abdomen at the level of the umbilicus (belly button). They are connected to an oscillator and subsequent frequency demodulation electronics to obtain digital waveforms. During inspiration the cross-sectional area of the rib cage and abdomen increases altering the self-inductance of the coils and the frequency of their oscillation, with the increase in cross-sectional area proportional to lung volumes. The electronics convert this change in frequency to a digital respiration waveform where the amplitude of the waveform is proportional to the inspired breath volume. A typical pitch of the wire sinusoid is in the range 1-2 cm and the inductance of the belt is ~ 2-4 microhenries per metre of belt. The inductance can be measured by making it part of the tuned circuit of an oscillator and then measuring the oscillation frequency.

== Single Vs. Dual Band Respiration ==
=== Dual Band Respiration ===
Konno and Mead extensively evaluated a two-degrees-of-freedom model of chest wall motion, whereby ventilation could be derived from measurements of rib cage and abdomen displacements. With this model, tidal volume (Vt) was calculated as the sum of the anteroposterior dimensions of the rib cage and abdomen, and could be measured to within 10% of actual Vt as long as a given posture was maintained.

=== Single Band Respiration ===
Changes in volume of the thoracic cavity can also be inferred from displacements of the rib cage and diaphragm. Motion of the rib cage can be directly assessed, whereas the motion of the diaphragm is indirectly assessed as the outward movement of the anterolateral abdominal wall. However, accuracy issues arise when trying to assess accurate respiratory volumes from a single respiration band placed either at the thorax, abdomen or midline. Due to differences in posture and thoraco-abdominal respiratory synchronization it is not possible to obtain accurate respiratory volumes with a single band. Furthermore, the shape of the acquired waveform tends to be non-linear due to the non-exact co-ordination of the two respiratory compartments. This further limits quantification of many useful respiratory indices and limits utility to only respiration rates and other basic timing indices. Therefore, to accurately perform volumetric respiratory measurements, a dual band respiratory sensor system must be required.

== RIP Data Analysis ==
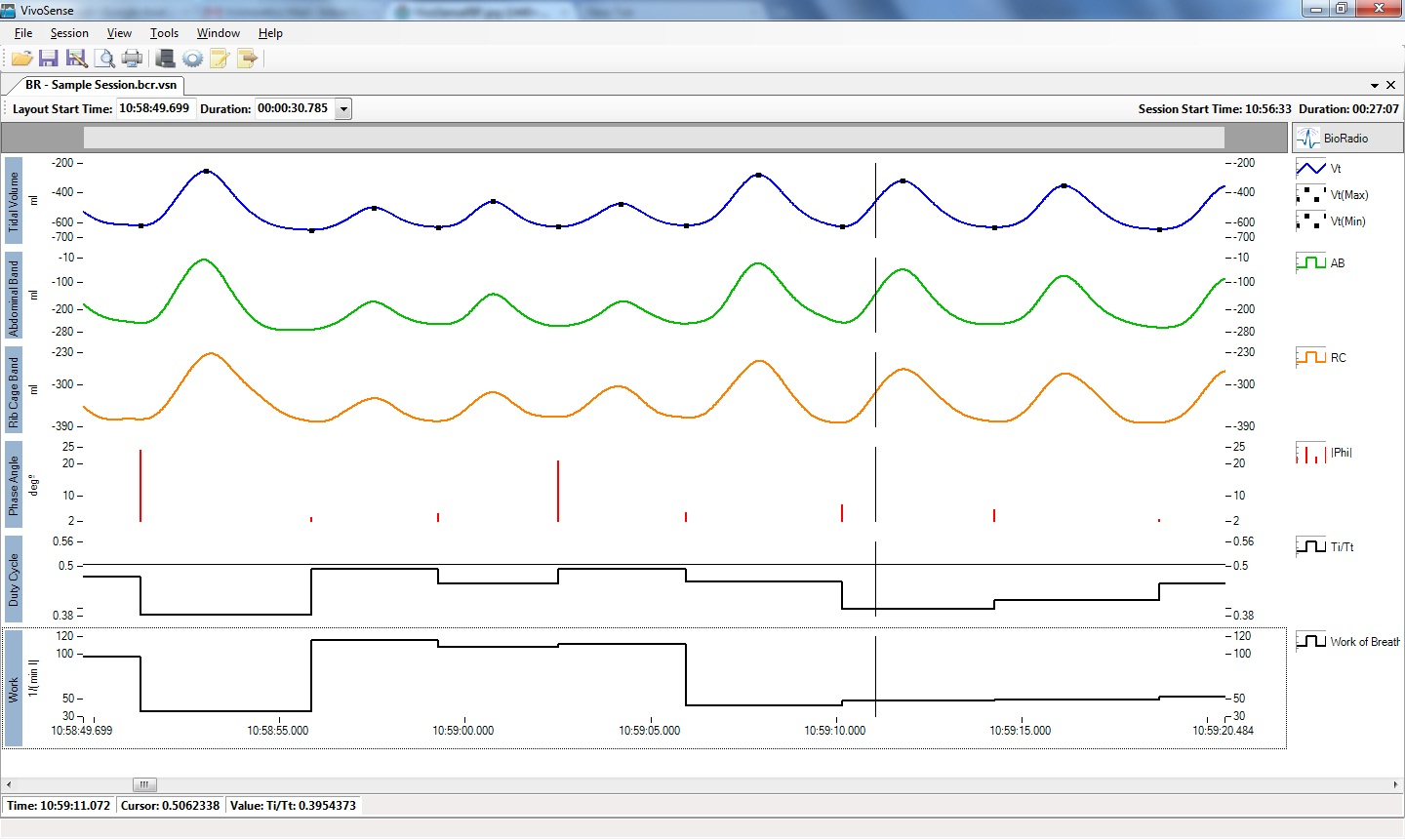
Dual Band Measures in VivoSense Software

Dual band respiratory inductance plethysmography can be used to describe various measures of complex respiratory patterns. The image shows waveforms and measures commonly analyzed.

Respiratory rate is the number of breaths per minute. A non-specific measure of respiratory disorder.

Tidal volume (Vt) is the volume inspired and expired with each breath. Variability in the wave form can be used to differentiate between restrictive (less) and obstructive pulmonary diseases as well as acute anxiety.

Minute ventilation is equivalent to tidal volume multiplied by respiratory rate and is used to assess metabolic activity.

Peak inspiratory flow (PifVt) is a measure that reflects respiratory drive, the higher its value, the greater the respiratory drive in the presence of coordinated thoraco-abdominal or even moderately discoordinated thoraco-abdominal movements.

Fractional inspiratory time (Ti/Tt) is the "Duty cycle" (Ti/Tt, ratio of time of inspirations to total breath time). Low values may reflect severe airways obstruction and can also occur during speech. Higher values are observed when snoring.

Work of breathing is a measure of a "Rapid shallow breathing index".

Peak/mean inspiratory and expiratory flow measures the presence of upper airway flow limitations during inspiration and expiration.

%RCi is the percent contribution of the rib cage excursions to the tidal volume Vt. The %RCi contribution to Tidal Volume ratio is obtained by dividing the inspired volume in the RC band by the inspired volume in the algebraic sum of RC + AB at the point of the peak of inspiratory tidal volume. This value is higher in woman than in men. The values are also generally higher during acute hyperventilation.

Phase Angle - Phi - Normal breathing involves a combination of both thoracic and abdominal (diaphragmatic) movements. During inhalation, both the thoracic and abdominal cavities simultaneously expand in volume, and thus in girth as well. If there is a blockage in the trachea or nasopharynx, the phasing of these movements will shift in relation to the degree of the obstruction. In the case of a total obstruction, the strong chest muscles force the thorax to expand, pulling the diaphragm upward in what is referred to as "paradoxical" breathing – paradoxical in that the normal phases of thoracic and abdominal motion are reversed. This is commonly referred to as the Phase Angle.

Apnea & hypopnea detection - Diagnostic components of sleep apnea/hypopnea syndrome and periodic breathing.

Apnea & hypopnea classification - Phase relation between thorax and abdomen classifies apnea/hypopnea events into central, mixed, and obstructive types.

qDEEL quantitative difference of end expiratory lung volume is a change in the level of end expiratory lung volume and may be elevated in Cheyne-Stokes respiration and periodic breathing.

== Accuracy ==
Dual band respiratory inductance plethysmography was validated in determining tidal volume during exercise and shown to be accurate. A version of RIP embedded in a garment called the LifeShirt was used for these validation studies.
