= Plethysmograph =

Medical instrument for measuring changes in volume

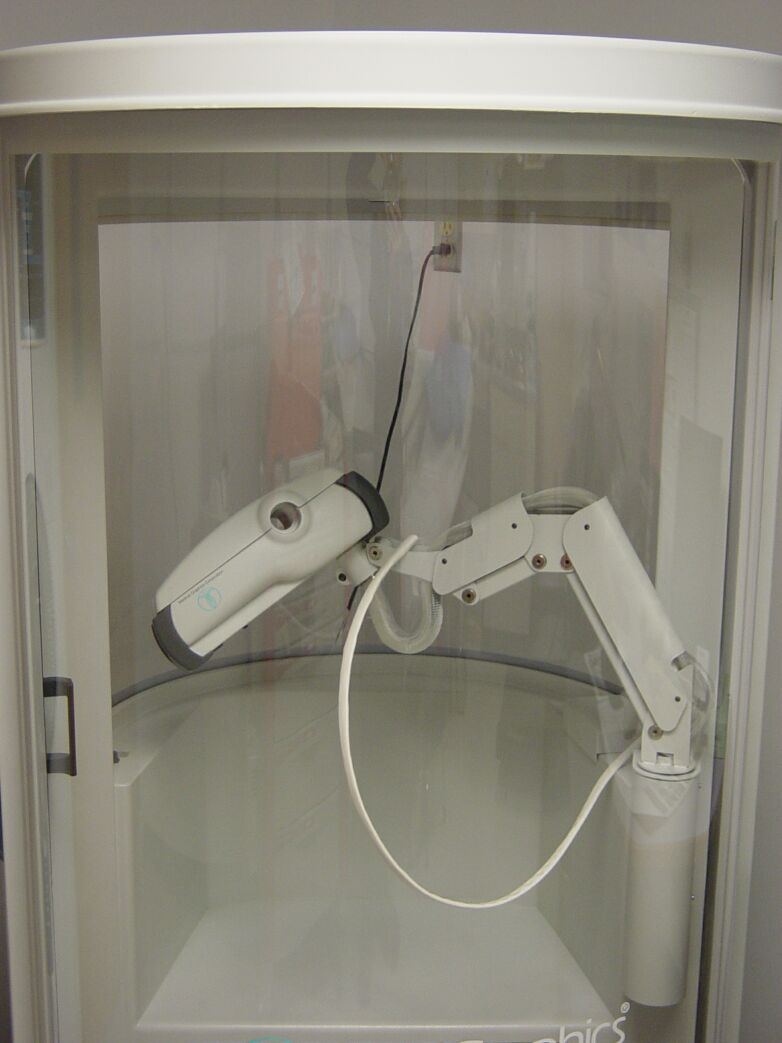
- Plethysmograph or "body box" used in lung measurements
- MeSH: D010991
- MedlinePlus: 003771

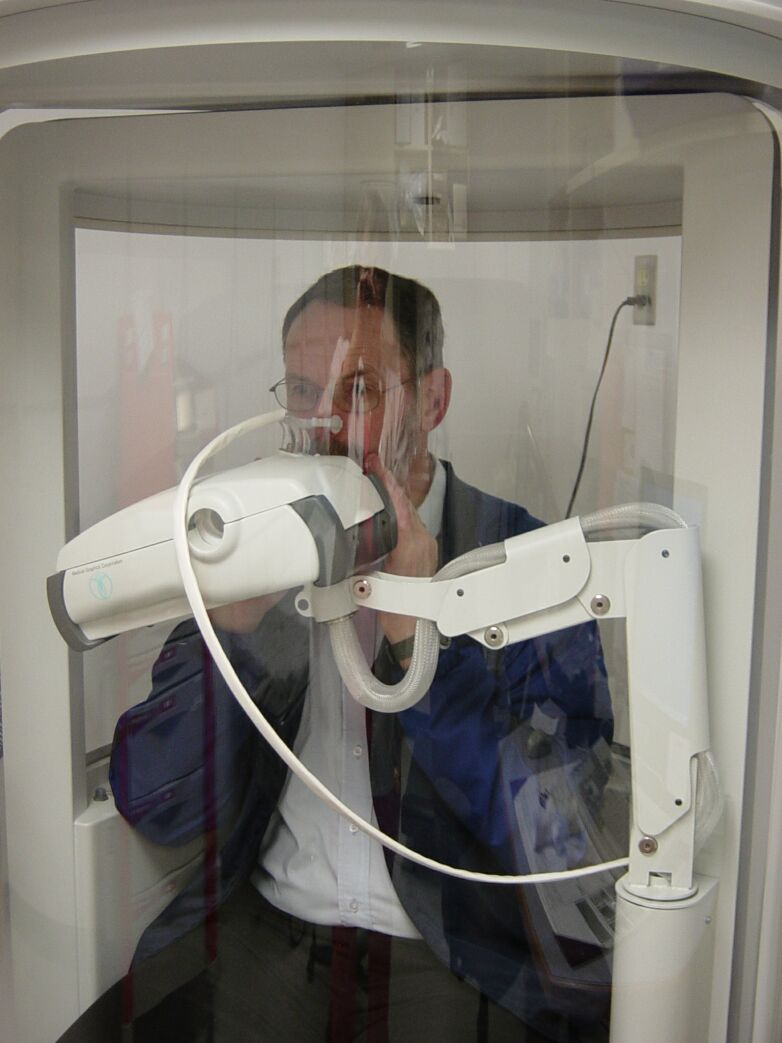
A man undergoing whole body plethysmography.

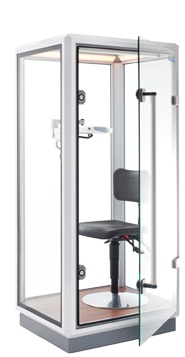
A modern body plethysmograph using ultrasound

A plethysmograph is an instrument for measuring changes in volume within an organ or whole body (usually resulting from fluctuations in the amount of blood or air it contains). The word is derived from the Greek "plethysmos" (increasing, enlarging, becoming full), and "graphein" (to write).

== Organs studied ==
=== Lungs ===
Pulmonary plethysmographs are commonly used to measure the functional residual capacity (FRC) of the lungs—the volume in the lungs when the muscles of respiration are relaxed—and total lung capacity.

In a traditional plethysmograph (or "body box"), the test subject, or patient, is placed inside a sealed chamber the size of a small telephone booth with a single mouthpiece. At the end of normal expiration, the mouthpiece is closed. The patient is then asked to make an inspiratory effort. As the patient tries to inhale (a maneuver which looks and feels like panting), the lungs expand, decreasing pressure within the lungs and increasing lung volume. This, in turn, increases the pressure within the box since it is a closed system and the volume of the box compartment has decreased to accommodate the new volume of the subject.

With cabinless plethysmography, the patient is seated next to a desktop testing device and inserts the mouthpiece into their mouth. The patient takes a series of normal tidal breaths for approximately one minute. During this tidal breathing, a series of rapid interruptions occurs, with a shutter opening and closing, measuring pressure and volume. Lung volume measurements taken with cabinless plethysmography are considered equivalent to body plethysmography.

==== Methodological approach ====
Boyle's law is used to calculate the unknown volume within the lungs. First, the change in volume of the chest is computed. The initial pressure of the box times its volume is considered equal to the known pressure after expansion times the unknown new volume. Once the new volume is found, the original volume minus the new volume is the change in volume in the box and also the change in volume in the chest. With this information, Boyle's law is used again to determine the original volume of gas in the chest: the initial volume (unknown) times the initial pressure is equal to the final volume times the final pressure. Starting from this principle, it can be shown that the functional residual capacity is a function of the changes in volume and pressures as follows:

$FRC = K_V \frac{\Delta V_{box}}{\Delta P_{mouth}} , K_V \approx P_{Barometric}$

The difference between full and empty lungs can be used to assess diseases and airway passage restrictions. An obstructive disease will show increased FRC because some airways do not empty normally, while a restrictive disease will show decreased FRC. Body plethysmography is particularly appropriate for patients who have air spaces which do not communicate with the bronchial tree; in such patients helium dilution would give an incorrectly low reading.

Another important parameter, which can be calculated with a body plethysmograph is the airway resistance. During inhalation the chest expands, which increases the pressure within the box. While observing the so-called resistance loop (cabin pressure and flow), diseases can easily be recognized. If the resistance loop becomes planar, this shows a bad compliance of the lung. A COPD, for instance, can easily be discovered because of the unique shape of the corresponding resistance loop.

=== Limbs ===
Some plethysmograph devices are attached to arms, legs or other extremities and used to determine circulatory capacity. In water plethysmography an extremity, e.g. an arm, is enclosed in a water-filled chamber where volume changes can be detected. Air plethysmography uses a similar principle but based on an air-filled long cuff, which is more convenient but less accurate. Another practical device is mercury-filled strain gauges used to continuously measure circumference of the extremity, e.g. at mid calf. Impedance plethysmography is a non-invasive method used to detect venous thrombosis in these areas of the body. Forearm plethysmography has replaced Flow-Mediated Dilation for assessing endothelial dysfunction.

=== Genitals ===
Another common type of plethysmograph is the penile plethysmograph. This device is used to measure changes in blood flow in the penis. Although some researchers use this device to assess sexual arousal and sexual orientation, courts that have considered penile plethysmography generally rule that the technique is not sufficiently reliable for use in court. An approximate female equivalent to penile plethysmography is vaginal photoplethysmography, which optically measures blood flow in the vagina.

== Use in preclinical research ==
Plethysmography is a widely used method in basic and preclinical research to study respiration. Several techniques are used:

=== Respiratory parameters from conscious freely moving animals: whole-body plethysmography ===
Whole-body plethysmography is used to measure respiratory parameters in conscious unrestrained subjects, including quantification of bronchoconstriction.

The standard plethysmograph sizes are for the study of mice, rats and guinea pigs. On request, larger plethysmographs can also be manufactured for other animals, such as rabbits, dogs, pigs, or primates.

The plethysmograph has two chambers, each fitted with a pneumotachograph. The subject is placed in one of them (subject chamber) and the other remains empty (reference chamber).

The pressure change is measured by a differential pressure transducer with one port exposed to the subject chamber and the other to the reference chamber.

=== Respiratory parameters from conscious restrained animals: double-chamber / head-out plethysmography ===
The double-chamber plethysmograph (dcp) measures respiratory parameters in a conscious restrained subject, including airway resistance and conductance. Different sizes of plethysmograph exist to study mice, rats or guinea pigs.

The head-out configuration is identical to the standard configuration described above except that there is no head chamber.

Of course the collar seal is still applied, so that the body chamber remains airtight. With only a thoracic signal, all parameters can be obtained except for specific airway resistance (SRaw) and specific airway conductance (Sgaw).

=== Resistance/compliance from sedated animals ===
In anesthetized plethysmography, lung resistance and dynamic compliance are measured directly because the subject is anesthetized.

Depending on the level of sedation, the subject may be spontaneously breathing (SB configuration) or under mechanical ventilation (MV configuration). A flow signal and a pressure signal are required to calculate compliance and resistance.

=== Cerebral blood flow ===
Cerebral venous blood flow has been recently studied trying to establish a connection between Chronic cerebrospinal venous insufficiency and multiple sclerosis. The small study is not big enough to establish a conclusion, but some association has been shown.

== See also ==
- Optoelectronic plethysmography
- Photoplethysmograph
- Respiratory inductance plethysmography
