= Lung volumes and capacities =

Volume of air in the lungs

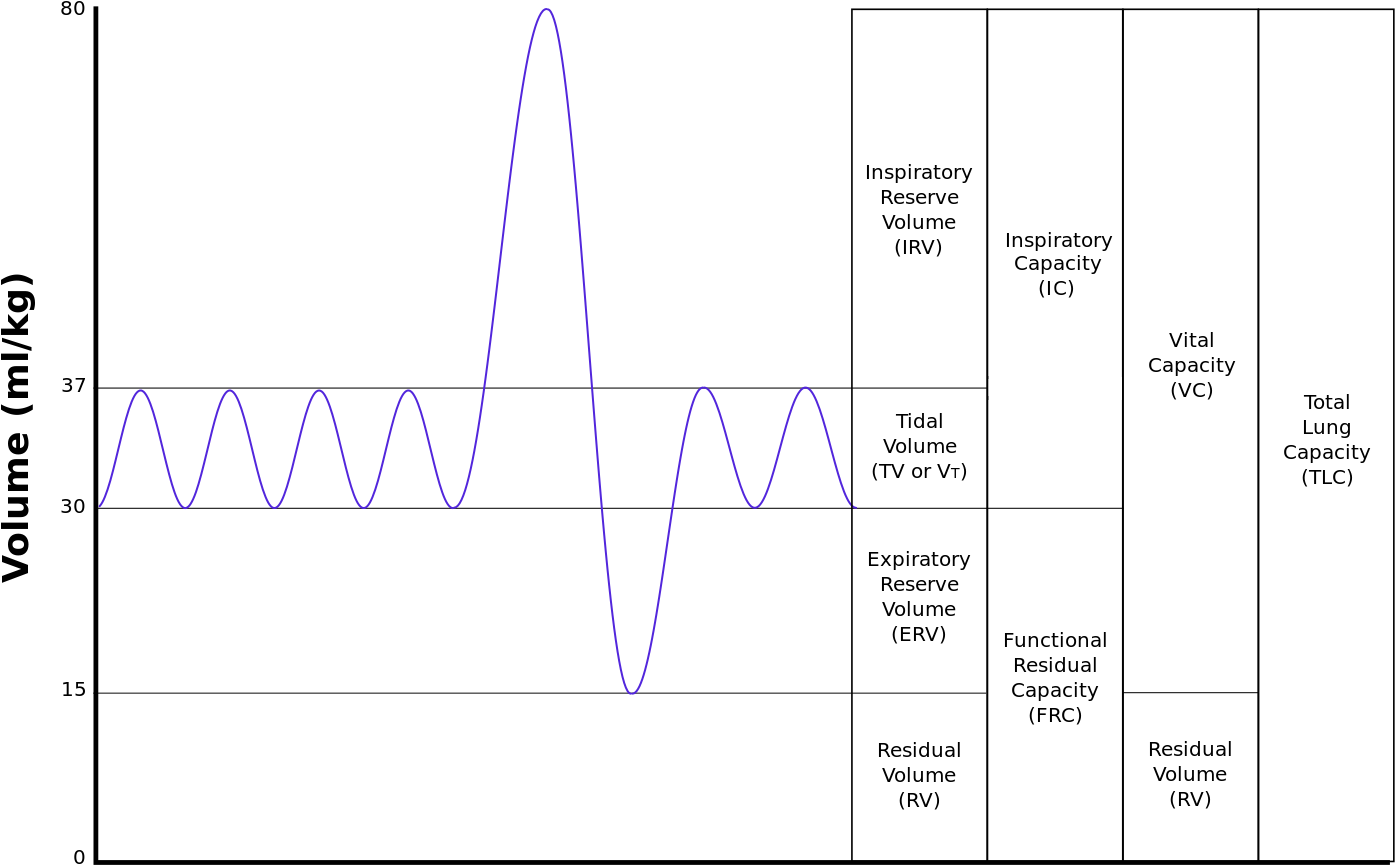
- TLC: Total lung capacity: the volume in the lungs at maximal inflation, the sum of VC and RV.
- TV: Tidal volume: that volume of air moved into or out of the lungs in 1 breath (TV indicates a subdivision of the lung; when tidal volume is precisely measured, as in gas exchange calculation, the symbol TV or V_{T} is used.)
- RV: Residual volume: the volume of air remaining in the lungs after a maximal exhalation
- ERV: Expiratory reserve volume: the maximal volume of air that can be exhaled from the end-expiratory position
- IRV: Inspiratory reserve volume: the maximal volume that can be inhaled from the end-inspiratory level
- IC: Inspiratory capacity: the sum of IRV and TV
- IVC: Inspiratory vital capacity: the maximum volume of air inhaled from the point of maximum expiration
- VC: Vital capacity: the volume of air breathed out after the deepest inhalation.
- V_{T}: Tidal volume: that volume of air moved into or out of the lungs during quiet breathing (VT indicates a subdivision of the lung; when tidal volume is precisely measured, as in gas exchange calculation, the symbol TV or V_{T} is used.)
- FRC: Functional residual capacity: the volume in the lungs at the end-expiratory position
- RV/TLC%: Residual volume expressed as percent of TLC
- V_{A}: Alveolar gas volume
- V_{L}: Actual volume of the lung including the volume of the conducting airway.
- FVC: Forced vital capacity: the determination of the vital capacity from a maximally forced expiratory effort
- FEV_{t}: Forced expiratory volume (time): a generic term indicating the volume of air exhaled under forced conditions in the first t seconds
- FEV_{1}: Volume that has been exhaled at the end of the first second of forced expiration
- FEF_{x}: Forced expiratory flow related to some portion of the FVC curve; modifiers refer to amount of FVC already exhaled
- FEF_{max}: The maximum instantaneous flow achieved during a FVC maneuver
- FIF: Forced inspiratory flow: (Specific measurement of the forced inspiratory curve is denoted by nomenclature analogous to that for the forced expiratory curve. For example, maximum inspiratory flow is denoted FIF_{max}. Unless otherwise specified, volume qualifiers indicate the volume inspired from RV at the point of measurement.)
- PEF: Peak expiratory flow: The highest forced expiratory flow measured with a peak flow meter
- MVV: Maximal voluntary ventilation: volume of air expired in a specified period during repetitive maximal effort

Lung volumes and lung capacities are measures of the volume of air in the lungs at different phases of the respiratory cycle.

The average total lung capacity of an adult human male is about 6 litres of air.

Tidal breathing is normal, resting breathing; the tidal volume is the volume of air that is inhaled or exhaled in only a single such breath.

The average human respiratory rate is 30–60 breaths per minute at birth, decreasing to 12–20 breaths per minute in adults.

== Factors affecting volumes ==
Several factors affect lung volumes; some can be controlled, and some cannot be controlled. Lung volumes vary with different people as follows:

Larger volume	Smaller volumes
taller people	shorter people
people who live at higher altitudes	people who live at lower altitudes
fit	obese

A person who is born and lives at sea level will develop a slightly smaller lung capacity than a person who spends their life at a high altitude. This is because the partial pressure of oxygen is lower at higher altitude which, as a result means that oxygen less readily diffuses into the bloodstream. In response to higher altitude, the body's diffusing capacity increases in order to process more air. Also, due to the lower environmental air pressure at higher altitudes, the air pressure within the breathing system must be lower in order to inhale; in order to meet this requirement, the thoracic diaphragm has a tendency to lower to a greater extent during inhalation, which in turn causes an increase in lung volume.

When someone living at or near sea level travels to locations at high altitudes (e.g. the Andes; Denver, Colorado; Tibet; the Himalayas) that person can develop a condition called altitude sickness because their lungs remove adequate amounts of carbon dioxide but they do not take in enough oxygen. (In normal individuals, carbon dioxide is the primary determinant of respiratory drive.)

Lung function development is reduced in children who grow up near motorways although this seems at least in part reversible. Air pollution exposure affects FEV_{1} in asthmatics, but also affects FVC and FEV_{1} in healthy adults even at low concentrations.

Specific changes in lung volumes also occur during pregnancy. Functional residual capacity drops 18–20%, typically falling from 1.7 to 1.35 litres, due to the compression of the diaphragm by the uterus. The compression also causes a decreased total lung capacity (TLC) by 5% and decreased expiratory reserve volume by 20%. Tidal volume increases by 30–40%, from 0.5 to 0.7 litres, and minute ventilation by 30–40% giving an increase in pulmonary ventilation. This is necessary to meet the increased oxygen requirement of the body, which reaches 50 ml/min, 20 ml of which goes to reproductive tissues. Overall, the net change in maximum breathing capacity is zero.

== Values ==
Average lung volumes in healthy adults
Volume	Value (litres)	
Volume	In men	In women
Inspiratory reserve volume (IRV)	3.3	1.9
Tidal volume (TV)	0.5	0.5
Expiratory reserve volume (ERV)	1.1	0.7
Residual volume (RV)	1.2	1.1

Lung capacities in healthy adults
Volume	Average value (litres)		Derivation
Volume	In men	In women	Derivation
Vital capacity	4.8	3.1	IRV + TV + ERV
Inspiratory capacity	3.8	2.4	IRV + TV
Functional residual capacity	2.4	1.8	ERV + RV
Total lung capacity	6.0	4.2	IRV + TV + ERV + RV

The tidal volume, vital capacity, inspiratory capacity and expiratory reserve volume can be measured directly with a spirometer. These are the basic elements of a ventilatory pulmonary function test.

Determination of the residual volume is more difficult as it is impossible to "completely" breathe out. Therefore, measurement of the residual volume has to be done via indirect methods such as radiographic planimetry, body plethysmography, closed circuit dilution (including the helium dilution technique) and nitrogen washout.

In absence of such, estimates of residual volume have been prepared as a proportion of body mass for infants (18.1 ml/kg), or as a proportion of vital capacity (0.24 for men and 0.28 for women) or in relation to height and age ((0.0275* Age [Years]+0.0189*Height [cm]−2.6139) litres for normal-mass individuals and (0.0277*Age [Years]+0.0138*Height [cm]−2.3967) litres for overweight individuals). Standard errors in prediction equations for residual volume have been measured at 579 ml for men and 355 ml for women, while the use of 0.24*FVC gave a standard error of 318 ml.

Online calculators are available that can compute predicted lung volumes, and other spirometric parameters based on a patient's age, height, weight, and ethnic origin for many reference sources.

British rower and three-time Olympic gold medalist Pete Reed is reported to hold the largest recorded lung capacity of 11.68 litres; US swimmer Michael Phelps is also said to have a lung capacity of around 12 litres.

=== Weight of breath ===
The mass of one breath is approximately a gram (0.5-5 g). A litre of air weighs about 1.2 g (1.2 kg/m^{3}). A half litre ordinary tidal breath weighs 0.6 g; a maximal 4.8 litre breath (average vital capacity for males) weighs approximately 5.8 g.

== Restrictive and obstructive ==
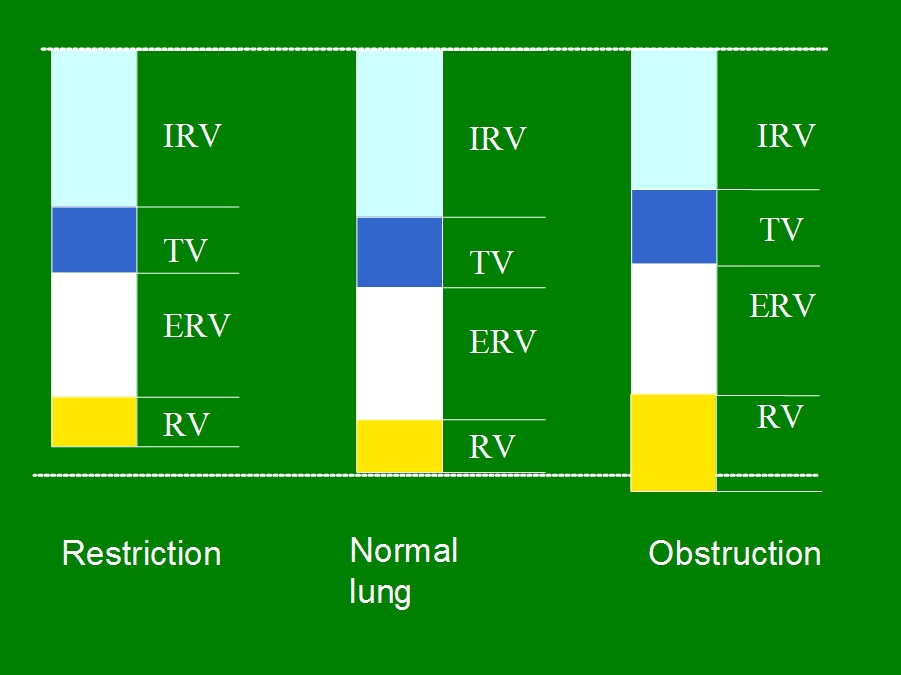
Scheme of changes in lung volumes in restricted and obstructed lung in comparison with healthy lung.

The results (in particular FEV_{1}/FVC and FRC) can be used to distinguish between restrictive and obstructive pulmonary diseases:

Type	Examples	Description	FEV_{1}/FVC
restrictive diseases	pulmonary fibrosis, Infant Respiratory Distress Syndrome, weak respiratory muscles, pneumothorax	volumes are decreased	often in a normal range (0.8–1.0)
obstructive diseases	asthma, COPD, emphysema	volumes are essentially normal but flow rates are impeded	often low (asthma can reduce the ratio to 0.6, emphysema can reduce the ratio to 0.78–0.45)

== See also ==
- Pulmonary function testing (PFT)
- Spirometry
