= Specific ventilation =

Measure of gas entering a region of the lung

In respiratory physiology, specific ventilation is defined as the ratio of the volume of gas entering a region of the lung (ΔV) following an inspiration, divided by the end-expiratory volume (V_{0}) of that same lung region:

SV = ΔV/V_{0}

It is a dimensionless quantity. For the whole human lung, given an indicative tidal volume of 0.6 L and a functional residual capacity of 2.5 L, average SV is of the order of 0.24.

The distribution of specific ventilation within the lung can be inferred using Multiple Breath Washout (MBW) experiments or imaging techniques such as Positron Emission Tomography (PET) using ^{13}N, Magnetic Resonance Imaging (MRI) using either hyperpolarized gas (^{3}He, ^{129}Xe) or proton MRI (oxygen enhanced imaging).
