= Optoelectronic plethysmography =

- Purpose: measure ventilation through an external measurement of the chest wall

Optoelectronic plethysmography is a method to evaluate ventilation through an external measurement of the chest wall surface motion.

A number of small reflective markers are placed on the thoraco-abdominal surface by hypoallergenic adhesive tape. A system for human motion analysis measures the three-dimensional coordinates of these markers and the enclosed volume is computed by connecting the points to form triangles.

From optoelectronic plethysmography it is thus possible to obtain volume variations of the entire chest wall and its different compartments. The chest wall can be modeled as being composed of three different compartments: pulmonary rib cage, abdominal rib cage, and the abdomen. This model is the most appropriate for the study of chest wall kinematics in the majority of conditions, including exercise. It takes into consideration the fact that the lung- and diaphragm-apposed parts of the rib cage are exposed to substantially different pressures on their inner surface during inspiration, that the diaphragm acts directly only on the abdominal rib cage, and that non-diaphragmatic inspiratory muscles act largely on the pulmonary rib cage. Abdominal volume change is defined as the volume swept by the abdominal wall.

Optoelectronic plethysmography can be used following different measurement protocols, specifically developed for different applications and different experimental and clinical situations. In the arrangement designed for the analysis in sitting and standing positions, 89 markers are arranged on the thoraco-abdominal surface. Optoelectronic plethysmography can be used also in supine and prone positions. Optoelectronic plethysmography was used to study chest wall kinematics in healthy subjects during exercise, patients with Chronic Obstructive Pulmonary Disease, patients with neuromuscular disorders and in Intensive Care Unit.

The validation of the method was obtained by comparing the lung volume changes obtained by Volumetric and Flow measuring Spirometers and chest wall total volumes by optoelectronic plethysmography during different maneuvers.

== History ==
This method has been developed at the Bioengineering Department of the Politecnico di Milano university by Andrea Aliverti and collaborators.
