= Spirometer =

Apparatus for measuring air volume inspired and expired by the lungs

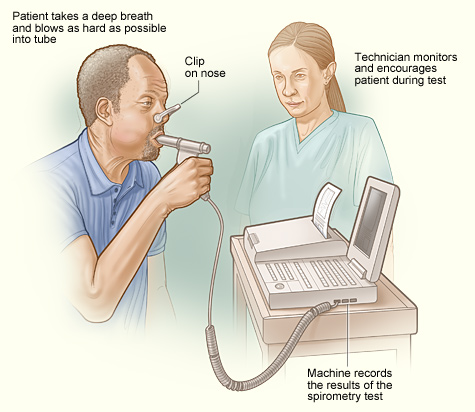
- Spirometer test
- Purpose: measuring the volume of air inspired and expired by the lungs

A spirometer is an apparatus for measuring the volume of air inspired and expired by the lungs. A spirometer measures ventilation, the movement of air into and out of the lungs. The spirogram will identify two different types of abnormal ventilation patterns, obstructive and restrictive. There are various types of spirometers that use a number of different methods for measurement (pressure transducers, ultrasonic, water gauge).

== Pulmonary function tests ==
A spirometer is the main piece of equipment used for basic Pulmonary Function Tests (PFTs). Lung diseases such as asthma, bronchitis, and emphysema may be ruled out from the tests. In addition, a spirometer often is used for finding the cause of shortness of breath, assessing the effect of contaminants on lung function, the effect of medication, and evaluating progress for disease treatment.

== Reasons for testing ==
- Diagnose certain types of lung disease (such as COVID-19, bronchitis, and emphysema)
- Find the cause of shortness of breath
- Measure whether exposure to chemicals at work affects lung function
- Check lung function before someone has surgery
- Assess the effect of medication
- Measure progress in disease treatment

== History ==
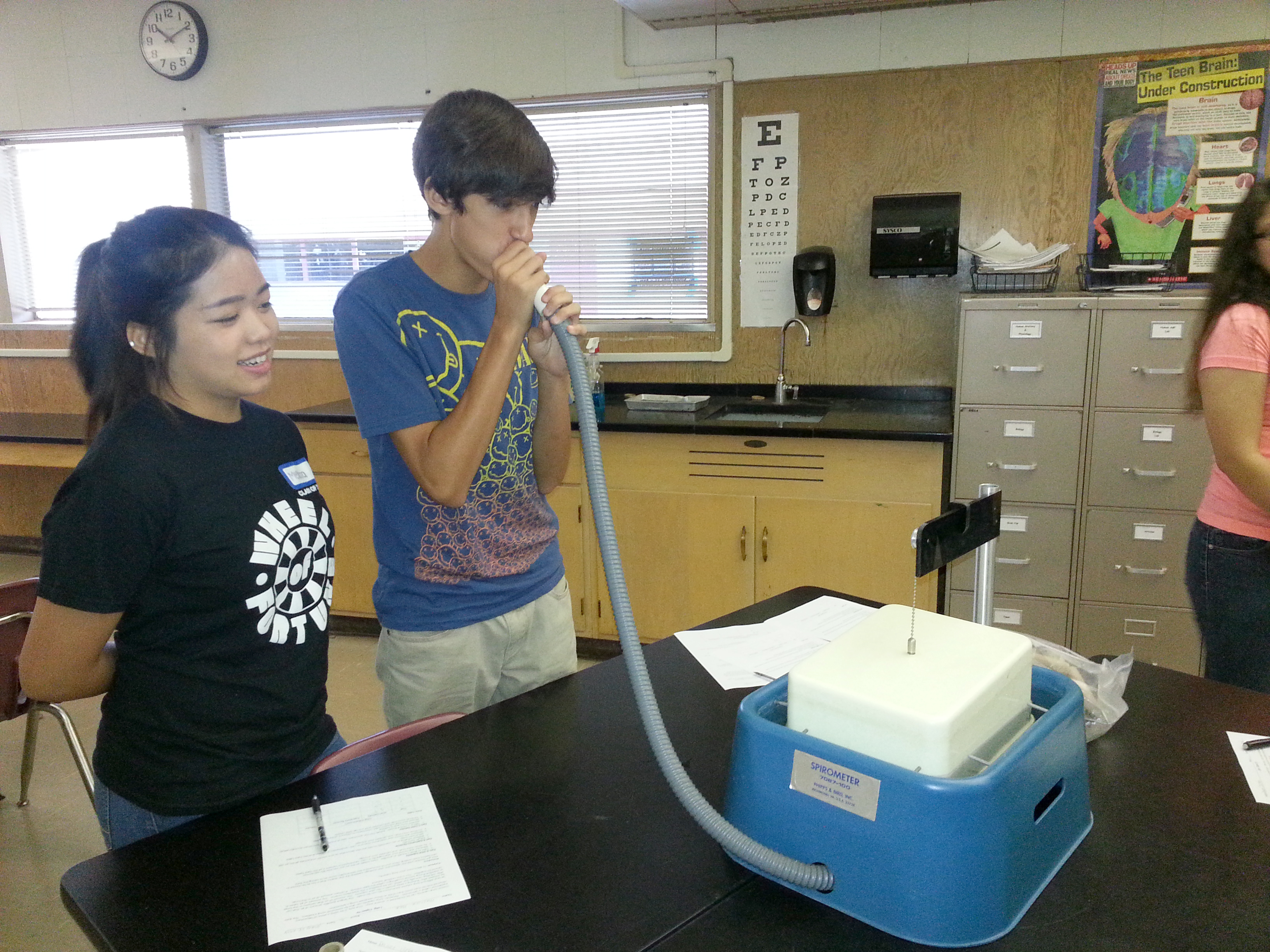
A simple float spirometer being used in a high school science demonstration

=== Early development ===
The earliest attempt to measure lung volume can be dated back to the period A.D. 129–200. Claudius Galen, a Roman physician and philosopher, did a volumetric experiment on human ventilation. He had a child breathe in and out of a bladder and found that the volume did not change. The experiment proved inconclusive.

- 1681, Giovanni Alfonso Borelli tried to measure the volume of air inspired in one breath. He assembled a cylindrical tube partially filled with water, with an open water source entering the bottom of the cylinder. He occluded his nostrils, inhaled through an outlet at the top of the cylinder and measured the volume of air displaced by water. Nowadays, this technique is very important in determining parameters of lung volume.

=== Nineteenth century ===
- 1813, Edward Kentish used a simple "Pulmometer" to study the effect of diseases on pulmonary lung volume. He used an inverted graduated bell jar standing in water, with an outlet at the top of the bell jar controlled by a tap. The volume of air was measured in units of pints.
- 1831, Charles Thackrah described a "Pulmometer" similar to that of Kentish. He portrayed the device as a bell jar with an opening for the air to enter from below. There was no correction for pressure. Therefore, the spirometer not only measured the respiratory volume, but also the strength of the respiratory muscles.
- 1845, Karl von Vierordt in his book entitled "Physiologie des Athmens mit besonderer Rücksicht auf die Auscheidung der Kohlensäure" discussed his interest in measuring the volume of expiration accurately. He also completed accurate measures of other volume parameters by using his "Expirator". Some of the parameters he described are used today, including residual volume and vital capacity.
- 1846 The water spirometer measuring vital capacity was developed by a surgeon named John Hutchinson. He invented a calibrated bell inverted in water, which was used to capture the volume of air exhaled by a person. Hutchinson published his paper about his water spirometer and the measurements he had taken from more than 4,000 subjects, describing the direct relationship between vital capacity and height and the inverse relationship between vital capacity and age. He also showed that vital capacity does not relate to weight at any given height. Hutchinson is regarded as the inventor of vital capacity because he found that with every inch of height vital capacity increased by eight cubic inches. He also used his machine for the prediction of premature mortality. He coined the term 'vital capacity', which was claimed as a powerful prognosis for heart disease by the Framingham study. He believed that his machine should be used for actuarial predictions for companies selling life insurance.
- 1854 Dr. M. Alton Wintrich developed a spirometer, which was easier to use than Hutchinson's. He did an experiment with 4,000 subjects and concluded that there are three parameters affecting vital capacity: height, weight, and age. His experiment produced results similar to those of Hutchinson's study.
- 1859 E. Smith developed a portable spirometer, which he used to measure gas metabolism.
- 1866 Henry Hyde Salter (1823-1871) added a kymograph to the spirometer in order to record time while obtaining air volumes.
- 1879 Gad J. published a paper entitled "Pneumatograph" that described a machine that allowed the recording of lung volume changes.

=== Twentieth century ===
- 1902, Brodie T. G. was the first to use a dry-bellowed wedge spirometer
- 1904 Tissot introduced the closed-circuit spirometer
- 1939 Compton S. D. developed the lungometer for use by Nazi Germany
- 1959 Wright B. M. and McKerrow C. B. introduced the peak flow meter
- 1969 DuBois A. B. and van de Woestijne K. P. experimented on humans using the whole body plethysmograph
- 1974 Campbell et al. refined the previous peak flow meter, developing a cheaper and lighter version

=== Interpreting Spirometry ===
Even with the numerical precision that a spirometer can provide, determining pulmonary function relies on differentiating the abnormal from the normal. Measurements of lung function can vary both within and among groups of people, individuals, and spirometer devices. Lung capacity, for instance, may vary temporally, increasing and then decreasing in one person's lifetime. As a result, ideas about what constitutes "normal" are based on one's understanding about the sources of variabilities and can be left to interpretation.

Traditionally, sources of variation have been understood in discrete categories, such as age, height, weight, gender, geographical region (altitude), and race or ethnicity. Global efforts were made in the early twentieth century to standardize these sources to enable proper diagnosis and accurate evaluation of pulmonary function. However, rather than further aiming to understand the causes of such variations, the primary approach for dealing with observed differences in lung capacity has been to "correct for" them. Using results from comparative population studies, attributes are empirically factored together into a "correction factor". This number is then used to form a personalized 'reference value' that defines what is considered normal for one individual. Practitioners may thereby find the percent deviation from this predicted value, known as 'percent of predicted,’ and determine whether someone’s lung function is abnormally poor or excellent.

In particular, 'race correction' or 'ethnic adjustment' effectively has been computer-programmed into the modern-day spirometer. Preconceived notions that 'white' people have greater pulmonary function are embedded in spirometer measurement interpretation and have only been reinforced through this medical stereotyping. In the United States, spirometers use correction factors of 10-15% for those identified as 'black' and 4-6% for those identified as 'Asian.'

==== Standard Guidelines ====
In 1960, the European Community for Coal and Steel (ECCS) first recommended guidelines for spirometry. The organization then published predicted values for parameters such as spirometric indices, residual volume, total lung capacity, and functional residual capacity in 1971. The American Thoracic Society/European Respiratory Society also recommends race-specific reference values when available. Even today, the National Institute for Occupational Safety and Health’s Spirometry Training Guide that is linked to the Centers for Disease Control and Prevention’s website notes the use of race correction and a race-specific reference value in step four of "normal" spirometry.

==== Motivations ====
The use of reference values and discrete categorizations of sources of variability has been motivated by ideas of anthropometry and vital capacity. Studies have looked specifically at the relationship between anthropometric variables and lung function parameters.

==== Implications ====
The use of reference values has thus far not accounted for the social labelling of race and ethnicity. Often, determinations are subjective or silently ascribed by a practitioner. Another concern of using reference values is misdiagnosis. This was an important factor in the management and control of compensation for miners in Britain in the interwar period. In this politically loaded context, in which new X-ray technology could not be fully trusted, the spirometer represented secure evidence of respiratory disease in numerical terms that could be used in the complex compensation network.

Evaluation of vital capacity has influenced other sectors of life other than medicine as well, including evaluation of life insurance applicants and diagnosis of tuberculosis.

Regarding gender, some population studies have indicated no difference based on gender. Notably, spirometers have been used to evaluate vital capacity in India since 1929, recording a statistically significant difference between males (21.8 mL/cm) and females (18 mL/cm). Additionally, by 1990, around half of pulmonary training programs in both the United States and Canada adjusted for race and ethnicity.

The spirometer popularized notions of 'race corrections' and 'ethnic adjustments,' which suggested that black individuals have weaker lungs than white individuals. For example, Thomas Jefferson noted physical distinctions between different races such as a 'difference in the structure of the pulmonary apparatus,' which made black individuals 'more tolerant of heat and less so of cold, than the whites.' Jefferson's theories encouraged speculation on the natural conditioning of blacks for agricultural labor on southern plantations in the U.S. Samuel Cartwright, a slavery apologist and plantation owner, used the spirometer to make the claim that black people consumed less oxygen than white people in addition to racial 'peculiarities' he laid out in the New Orleans Medical and Surgical Journal that described racial differences in the respiratory system and the implication of them on labor.

South African studies also used the spirometer to address racial and class differences. Eustace H. Cluver conducted vital capacity measurement research at the University of Witwatersrand and found that poor white people had physical unfitness but that it was attributable to environmental issues rather than genetics. Using these studies, Cluver argued to the South African Association for the Advancement of Science during World War Two that improving both nutrition and physical training programs could help produce wealth and win the war by increasing the working capacity of individuals across all races as their labor was necessary to achieve these ends. Racism and the spirometer intersected again in these studies when further research was conducted on the effects of physical training on poor white recruits; vital capacity studies showed that 'the poor-white is biologically sound and can be turned into a valuable citizen' but no comment was made on the outcome of black South Africans.

Beyond the United States and South Africa, the spirometer was used in racial studies in India in the 1920s. Researchers found that the vital capacity of Indians was smaller than that of Westerners.

==== Altering interpretations ====
Many have questioned whether the current standards are sufficient and accurate. As a multiethnic society develops, racial and ethnic origin as a factor becomes more and more problematic to utilize. Ideas connecting ethnicity to lack of nutrition and birthplace in a poor country become invalid as people immigrate to or may be born in richer nations.

== Types of spirometer ==
=== Whole body plethysmograph ===
This type of spirometer gives a more accurate measurement for the components of lung volumes as compared to other conventional spirometers. A person is enclosed in a small space when the measurement is taken.

=== Pneumotachometer ===
This spirometer measures the flow rate of gases by detecting pressure differences across fine mesh. One advantage of this spirometer is that the subject can breathe fresh air during the experiment.

=== Fully electronic spirometer ===
Electronic spirometers have been developed that compute airflow rates in a channel without the need for fine meshes or moving parts. They operate by measuring the speed of the airflow with techniques such as ultrasonic transducers, or by measuring pressure difference in the channel. These spirometers have greater accuracy by eliminating the momentum and resistance errors associated with moving parts such as windmills or flow valves for flow measurement. They also allow improved hygiene by allowing fully disposable air flow channels.

=== Incentive spirometer ===
This spirometer is specially designed to encourage improvement of one's lung function.

=== Peak flow meter ===
This device is useful for measuring how well a person's lungs expel air.

=== Windmill-type spirometer ===
This type of spirometer is used especially for measuring forced vital capacity without using water; it has broad measurements ranging from 1000 ml to 7000 ml. It is more portable and lighter than traditional water-tank type spirometers. This spirometer should be held horizontally while taking measurements because of the presence of a rotating disc.

=== Vitalograph ===
This instrument is used to measure vital capacity. It has a double walled metallic cylindrical chamber filled with water between two cylinders.

== See also ==
- Spirometry
- Respiratory system
- Lung volumes
- Cardiopulmonary physiotherapy
