= John Hutchinson (surgeon) =

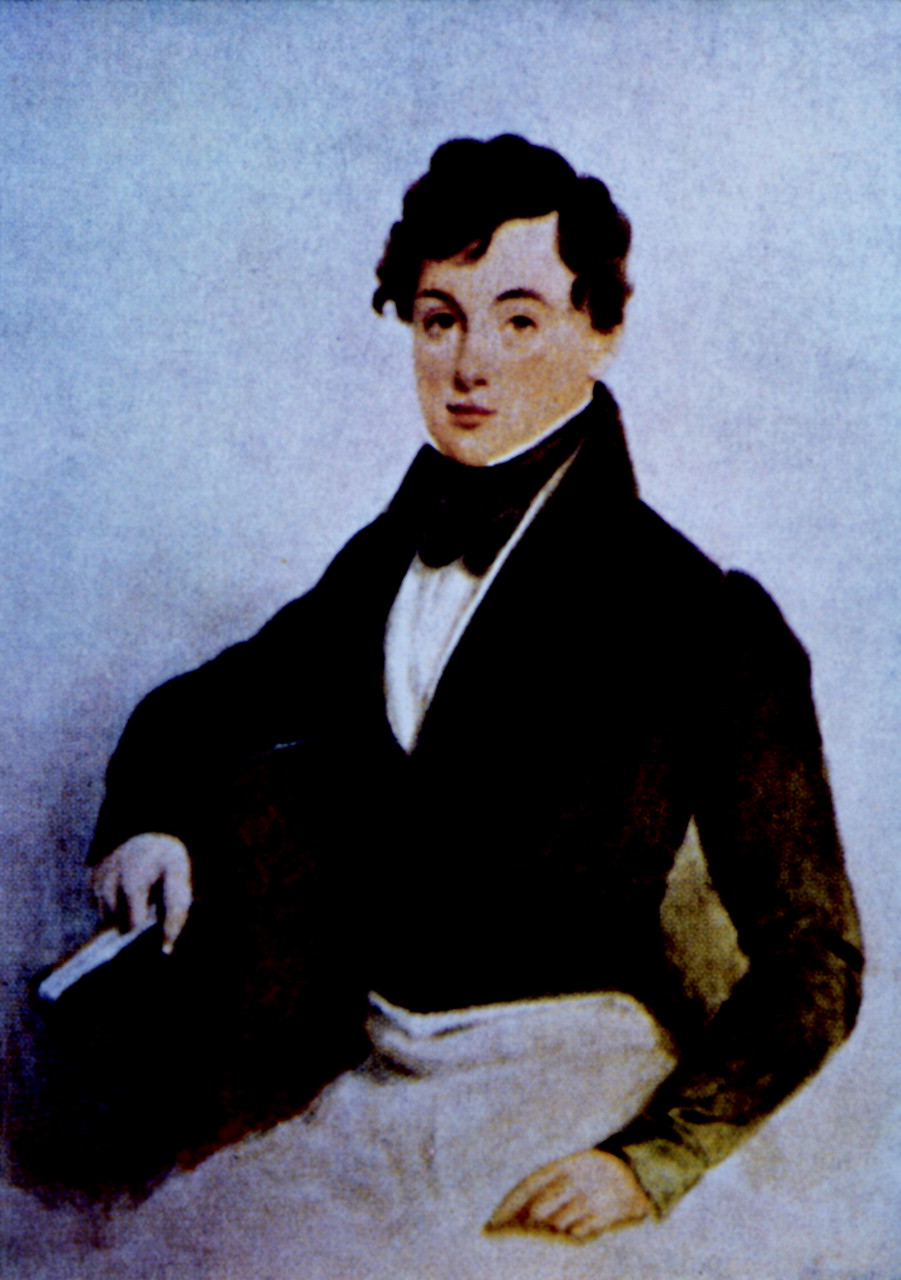
- Born: 1811; Newcastle upon Tyne, England
- Died: 1861 (aged 49–50); Fiji
- Known for: Spirometer
- Spouse: Ann Sarah Buckle
- Children: John Haller Hutchinson; Mary Elizabeth Hutchinson
- Scientific career
- Fields: Medicine

John Hutchinson was born in 1811 in Ryton, a village near Newcastle upon Tyne, where his father was a yeoman farmer and colliery manager. Hutchinson initially trained as a surgeon in the North-East, but following his father’s death in 1834, he went to London and completed his training at University College, passing the examination for MRCS in 1836.

In 1840 he married Ann Sarah Buckle, the daughter of a London merchant. Her brother was Henry Buckle.

Hutchinson invented the spirometer, a device for measuring lung capacity, which he used while evaluating candidates for life insurance as a surgeon for Brittania Life. He gave the maximum measurable lung capacity the name 'vital capacity’, a term which persists to the present day. He undertook the first systematic study of vital capacity, measuring over two thousand individuals from all walks of life, and has been described as ‘the first respiratory epidemiologist' He presented his findings to the Royal Medical and Chirurgical Society of London (later the Royal Society of Medicine). He was the first person to recognise the importance of normal reference values for lung volumes, which he based upon height. His work gained him the degree of MD from Geissen, which gave him the title of Dr. Hutchinson, and allowed him to refer to himself as a physician, an important distinction.

In common with other practitioners of the time, Hutchinson was very concerned about the need for good ventilation in indoor environments, since disease was thought to be caused by miasmas of rotting matter, or ‘malaria’. He also took an interest in the safety of coal miners, and gave evidence to the House of Lords on the need for secure and separate air channels for ingress and egress of air. His interest in ventilation led to him acting as a consultant to Sir Goldsworthy Gurney in his attempts to improve the ventilation and heating of the Houses of Parliament.

Hutchinson was appointed an Assistant Physician at the Brompton Hospital for Chest Diseases in London, and had a wife and son. Despite his apparent success in life, in 1852 he abandoned both his London career and his family and signed on as a ship’s surgeon travelling to Melbourne, Australia and later to the gold-rush town of Sandhurst (Bendigo), where he practised as a physician. After several high-profile disputes with both medical colleagues and other citizenshe sailed to Fiji in 1861, where he died a few months later after contracting dysentery.

In addition to his inventive engineering skills, Hutchinson was described by colleagues as a talented musician, draughtsman, and sculptor. The reason for his departure for Australia has never been satisfactorily explained.
