= Flow-mediated dilation =

Dilation of an artery

Flow-mediated dilation (FMD) refers to dilation of an artery when blood flow increases. FMD is determined in humans using a noninvasive ultrasound assessment of the brachial artery. It is a research indicator for endothelial function and possible diagnosis of cardiovascular diseases. In laboratory research, release of nitric oxide by endothelial cells is a factor producing FMD.

== Method ==
To determine FMD, brachial artery dilation following a transient period of forearm ischemia is measured using ultrasound. Because the value of FMD can be compromised when improperly applied, a standardized method for measuring FMD is used. The clinical value of FMD is limited by the fact that it is difficult to measure, requiring a skilled and well-trained clinician.

== Research ==
FMD has been used as a noninvasive index of the function of resistance vessels and the capillary endothelium. Low FMD is used as a potential predictor of future cardiovascular disease, and as a possible biomarker for blood vessel disorders associated with chronic smoking.

== See also ==
- Atherosclerosis
- Hypercholesterolemia
