= D-dimer =

Fibrin degradation product present in the blood after a thrombus

D-dimer (or D dimer) is a dimer that is a fibrin degradation product (FDP), a small protein fragment present in the blood after a blood clot is degraded by fibrinolysis. It is so named because it contains two D fragments of the fibrin protein joined by a cross-link, hence forming a protein dimer.

D-dimer concentration may be determined by a blood test to help diagnose thrombosis. Since its introduction in the 1990s, it has become an important test performed in people with suspected thrombotic disorders, such as venous thromboembolism. While a negative result practically rules out thrombosis, a positive result can indicate thrombosis but does not exclude other potential causes. Its main use, therefore, is to exclude thromboembolic disease where the probability is low.

D-dimer levels are used as a predictive biomarker for the blood disorder disseminated intravascular coagulation and in the coagulation disorders associated with COVID-19 infection. A four-fold increase in the protein is an indicator of poor prognosis in people hospitalized with COVID-19.

== Principles ==
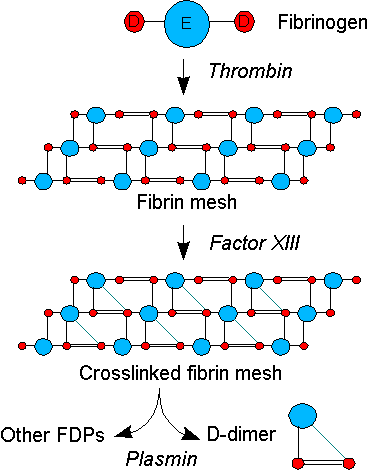
D-dimer formation. Shown are fibrinogen, with its one E domain and two D domains, acted upon in cascade, by the following enzymes: Thrombin, to create a mesh of fibrin protofibrils; Factor XIII to crosslink the fibrin mesh (linking protofibril D domains), the scaffold for clot formation; Plasmin, whose action in fibrinolysis produces fibrin degradation products (FDPs), the smallest of which are D-dimers, protein fragments with one E and two crosslinked D domains.

Coagulation, the formation of a blood clot or thrombus, occurs when the proteins of the coagulation cascade are activated, either by contact with a damaged blood vessel wall and exposure to collagen in the tissue space (intrinsic pathway) or by activation of factor VII by tissue activating factors (extrinsic pathway). Both pathways lead to the generation of thrombin, an enzyme that turns the soluble blood protein fibrinogen into fibrin, which aggregates into protofibrils. Another thrombin-generated enzyme, factor XIII, then crosslinks the fibrin protofibrils at the D fragment site, leading to the formation of an insoluble gel that serves as a scaffold for blood clot formation.

The circulating enzyme plasmin, the main enzyme of fibrinolysis, cleaves the fibrin gel in a number of places. The resultant fragments, "high molecular weight polymers", are digested several times more by plasmin to lead to intermediate and then to small polymers (fibrin degradation products or FDPs). The cross-link between two D fragments remains intact, however, and these are exposed on the surface when the fibrin fragments are sufficiently digested. The structure of D-dimer is either a 180 kDa or 195 kDa molecule of two D domains, or a 340 kDa molecule of two D domains and one E domain. The half-life of D-dimer in blood is approximately 6 to 8 hours.

D-dimers are not normally present in human blood plasma, except when the coagulation system has been activated, for instance, because of the presence of thrombosis or disseminated intravascular coagulation. The D-dimer assay depends on the binding of a monoclonal antibody to a particular epitope on the D-dimer fragment. Several detection kits are commercially available; all of them rely on a different monoclonal antibody against D-dimer. For some of these, the area of the D-dimer to which the antibody binds is known. The binding of the antibody is then measured quantitatively by one of various laboratory methods.

== Indications ==
D-dimer testing is of clinical use when there is a suspicion of deep venous thrombosis (DVTl), pulmonary embolism (PE) or disseminated intravascular coagulation (DIC).

For DVT and PE, there are possible various scoring systems that are used to determine the a priori clinical probability of these diseases; the best-known is the Wells score.

- For a high score, or pretest probability, a D-dimer will make little difference and anticoagulant therapy will be initiated regardless of test results, and additional testing for DVT or pulmonary embolism may be performed.
- For a moderate or low score, or pretest probability:
  - A negative D-dimer test will virtually rule out thromboembolism: the degree to which the D-dimer reduces the probability of thrombotic disease is dependent on the test properties of the specific test used in the clinical setting: most available D-dimer tests with a negative result will reduce the probability of thromboembolic disease to less than 1% if the pretest probability is less than 15-20%. Chest computed tomography (CT angiography) should not be used to evaluate pulmonary embolism for persons with negative results of a D-dimer assay. A low pretest probability is also valuable in ruling out PE.
  - If the D-dimer reads high, then further testing (ultrasound of the leg veins or lung scintigraphy or CT scanning) is required to confirm the presence of thrombus. Anticoagulant therapy may be started at this point or withheld until further tests confirm the diagnosis, depending on the clinical situation.

In some hospitals, they are measured by laboratories after a form is completed showing the probability score and only if the probability score is low or intermediate. This reduces the need for unnecessary tests in those who are high-probability. Performing the D-dimer test first can avoid a significant proportion of imaging tests and is less invasive. Since the D-dimer can exclude the need for imaging, specialty professional organizations recommend that physicians use D-dimer testing as an initial diagnostic.

== Interpretation ==
=== Reference ranges ===
The following are reference ranges for D-dimer:

Units	Nonpregnant adult	First trimester	Second trimester	Third trimester
mg/L or μg/mL	< 0.5	0.05 - 0.95	0.32 - 1.29	0.13 -1.7
μg/L or ng/mL	< 500	50 - 950	320 - 1290	130 - 1700
nmol/L	< 2.7	0.3 - 5.2	1.8 - 7.1	0.7 - 9.3

D-dimer increases with age. It has therefore been suggested to use a cutoff equal to patient's age in years × 10 μg/L (or x 0.056 nmol/L) for patients aged over 50 years for the suspicion of venous thromboembolism (VTE), as it decreases the false positive rate without substantially increasing the false negative rate.

An alternative measurement of D-dimer is in fibrinogen equivalent units (FEU). The molecular weight of the fibrinogen molecule is about twice the size of the D-dimer molecule, and therefore 1.0 mcg/mL FEU is equivalent to 0.5 mcg/mL of d-dimer.

=== Thrombotic disease ===
Various kits have a 93 to 95% sensitivity (true positive rate). For hospitalized patients, one study found the specificity to be about 50% (related to false positive rate) in the diagnosis of thrombotic disease.

- False positive readings can be due to various causes: liver disease, high rheumatoid factor, inflammation, malignancy, trauma, pregnancy, recent surgery as well as advanced age.
- False negative readings can occur if the sample is taken either too early after thrombus formation or if testing is delayed for several days. Additionally, the presence of anti-coagulation can render the test negative because it prevents thrombus extension. The anti-coagulation medications dabigatran and rivaroxaban decrease D-dimer levels but do not interfere with the D-dimer assay.
- False values may be obtained if the specimen collection tube is not sufficiently filled (false low value if underfilled and false high value if overfilled). This is due to the dilutional effect of the anticoagulant (the blood must be collected in a 9:1 blood to anticoagulant ratio).
- Likelihood ratios are derived from sensitivity and specificity to adjust pretest probability.
- Elevated plasma D-dimer levels following ICH serve as an independent risk factor for poor functional outcomes and mortality.

In interpretation of the D-dimer, a value above 500 μg/L is considered abnormal. Since 2001 there have been numerous studies that show for patients over age 50, a value of (patient's age) × 10 μg/L may be abnormal; this has been validated in multiple different D-dimer assays. This has now been incorporated in clinical practice guidelines.

== History ==
D-dimer was originally identified, described and named in 1973, at the National Institute for Medical Research in Mill Hill, Greater London. It found its diagnostic application in the 2000s. Its use has now been formalised in clinical practice guidelines.
