= Fibrin degradation product =

Blood degradation product

Principles of D-dimer testing

Fibrin degradation products (FDPs), also known as fibrin split products, are components of the blood produced by clot degeneration. Clotting, also called coagulation, at the wound site produces a mass of fibrin threads called a net that remains in place until the cut is healed. As a cut heals, the clotting slows down. Eventually the clot is broken down and dissolved by plasmin. When the clot and fibrin net dissolve, fragments of protein are released into the body. These fragments are fibrin degradation products or FDPs. If your body is unable to dissolve a clot, you may have abnormal levels of FDPs. The most notable subtype of fibrin degradation products is D-dimer.

The levels of these FDPs rise after any thrombotic event.

Fibrin and fibrinogen degradation product (FDP) testing is commonly used to diagnose disseminated intravascular coagulation.

== As tumor marker ==
A tumor marker known as AMDL-ELISA DR-70 (FDP), and now as Onko-Sure, was approved by the US FDA on July 1, 2008 for in vitro diagnostic only and serial testing for monitoring colorectal cancer with more effective by 50 percent than carcinoembryonic antigen (CEA) when CEA values is low. The Onko-Sure blood test can detect also tumors/cancers: of lung, breast, stomach, liver, colon; rectal, ovarian, esophageal, cervical, trophoblastic, thyroid, malignant lymphoma, and pancreatic.

== See also ==
- Fibrinolysis
