= Functional residual capacity =

Volume of air in the lungs at the end of passive expiration

Lung volumes

Functional residual capacity (FRC) is the volume of air present in the lungs at the end of passive expiration. At FRC, the opposing elastic recoil forces of the lungs and chest wall are in equilibrium and there is no exertion by the diaphragm or other respiratory muscles.

== Measurement ==
FRC is the sum of expiratory reserve volume (ERV) and residual volume (RV) and measures approximately 3000 mL in a 70 kg, average-sized male. It cannot be estimated through spirometry, since it includes the residual volume. In order to measure RV precisely, one would need to perform a test such as nitrogen washout, helium dilution or body plethysmography.

Positioning plays a significant role in altering FRC. It is highest when in an upright position and decreases as one moves from upright to supine/prone or Trendelenburg position. The greatest decrease in FRC occurs when going from 60° to totally supine at 0°. There is no significant change in FRC as position changes from 0° to Trendelenburg of up to −30°. However, beyond −30°, the drop in FRC is considerable.

== Clinical significance ==
A lowered or elevated FRC is often an indication of some form of respiratory disease. In restrictive diseases, the decreased total lung capacity leads to a lower FRC. In turn in obstructive diseases, the FRC is increased.

For instance, in emphysema, FRC is increased, because the lungs are more compliant and the equilibrium between the inward recoil of the lungs and outward recoil of the chest wall is disturbed. As such, patients with emphysema often have noticeably broader chests due to the relatively unopposed outward recoil of the chest wall. Total lung capacity also increases, largely as a result of increased functional residual capacity.

Obese and pregnant patients will have a lower FRC in the supine position due to the added tissue weight opposing the outward recoil of the chest wall thus reducing chest wall compliance. In pregnancy, this starts at about the fifth month and reaches 10-20% decrease at term. FRC tends to increase with aging due to changes in the static recoil of the lungs.

The predicted value of FRC was measured for large populations and published in several references. FRC was found to vary by a patient's age, height, and sex. Functional residual capacity is directly proportional to height and indirectly proportional with obesity.

The LOINC code is 19843-2 and the SNOMED CT concept is 65825000.
