= Helium dilution technique =

Lung function test

- Purpose: measures the functional residual capacity of the lungs

The helium dilution technique is the way of measuring the functional residual capacity of the lungs (the volume left in the lungs after normal expiration).

This technique is a closed-circuit system where a spirometer is filled with a mixture of helium (He) and oxygen. The amount of He in the spirometer is known at the beginning of the test (concentration × volume = amount). The patient is then asked to breathe (normal breaths) in the mixture starting from FRC (functional residual capacity), which is the gas volume in the lung after a normal breath out. The spirometer measures helium concentration. The helium spreads into the lungs of the patient, and settles at a new concentration (C2). Because there is no leak of substances in the system, the amount of helium remains constant during the test, and the FRC is calculated by using the following equation:

$C_1V_1=C_2V_2$

$C_1 V_1 = C_2 (V_1 + FRC)$

$FRC = \frac{C_1V_1}{C_2}- V_1$

$V_2 =$ total gas volume (FRC + volume of spirometer)

$V_1 =$ volume of gas in spirometer

$C_1 =$ initial (known) helium concentration

$C_2 =$ final helium concentration (measured by the spirometer)

== Measure ==
Note to measure FRC the patient is connected to the spirometer directly after a normal breath (when the lung volume equals FRC), if the patient is initially connected to the spirometer at a different lung volume (like TLC or RV) the measured volume will be the initial volume started from and not FRC. In patients with obstructive pulmonary diseases the measurements of the helium dilution technique are not reliable because of incomplete equilibration of the helium in all areas of the lungs. In such cases it is more accurate to use a body plethysmograph.

A simplified helium dilution technique may be used as an alternative to quantitative CT scans to assess end-expiratory lung volumes (EELV) among patients who are on mechanical ventilation with diagnosis of ALI/ARDS according to a cross-sectional study. The results show a good correlation [EELV(He)=208+0.858xEELV(CT), r=0.941, p < 0.001] between the two methods, and the helium dilution technique offers the advantages of lower cost, decreased transportation of critically ill patients, and reduced radiation exposure. This study's results may have limited generalizability due to its specificity to the ALI/ARDS population and its small sample size (21 patients).
