= Vital capacity =

Measure of human lung capacity

Output of a spirometer

Vital capacity (VC) is the maximum amount of air a person can expel from the lungs after a maximum inhalation. It is equal to the sum of inspiratory reserve volume, tidal volume, and expiratory reserve volume. It is approximately equal to Forced Vital Capacity (FVC).

A person's vital capacity can be measured by a wet or regular spirometer. In combination with other physiological measurements, the vital capacity can help make a diagnosis of underlying lung disease. Furthermore, the vital capacity is used to determine the severity of respiratory muscle involvement in neuromuscular disease, and can guide treatment decisions in Guillain–Barré syndrome and myasthenic crisis.

A normal adult has a vital capacity between 3 and 5 litres. A human's vital capacity depends on age, sex, height, mass, and possibly ethnicity. However, the dependence on ethnicity is poorly understood or defined, as it was first established by studying black slaves in the 19th century and may be the result of conflation with environmental factors.

Lung volumes and lung capacities refer to the volume of air associated with different phases of the respiratory cycle. Lung volumes are directly measured, whereas lung capacities are inferred from volumes.

== Role in diagnosis ==
The vital capacity can be used to help differentiate causes of lung disease. In restrictive lung disease the vital capacity is decreased. In obstructive lung disease it is usually normal or only slightly decreased.

== Estimated vital capacities ==
Males by height
Height	150–155 cm (4'11"–5'1")	155–160 cm (5'1"–5'3")	160–165 cm (5'3"–5'5")	165–170 cm (5'5"–5'7")	170–175 cm (5'7"–5'9")	175–180 cm (5'9"–5'11)
Vital capacity (cm^{3})	2900	3150	3400	3720	3950	4300

Males by age
Age	15–25	25–35	35–45	45–55	55–65
Vital capacity (cm^{3})	3425	3500	3225	3050	2850

=== Formulas ===
Vital capacity increases with height and decreases with age. Formulas to estimate vital capacity are:

$$\begin{align}
vc_{female} = (21.78 - 0.101 a ) \cdot h \\
vc_{male} = (27.63 - 0.112 a ) \cdot h \\
\end{align}$$
where $vc$ is approximate vital capacity in cm^{3}, $a$ is age in years, and $h$ is height in cm.
