= List of radiologic signs =

Radiologic signs are the signs used for diagnosing physiological and pathological conditions in radiologic images. This list includes the names of radiologic signs in alphabetical order.

== A ==
- Abdominal cocoon sign
- Absent bowtie sign
- Acorn cyst sign
- Air bronchogram
- Air crescent sign
- Angel wing appearance
- Anteater nose sign
- Aortic nipple sign
- Aortic unfolding
- Apple core sign (colon)
- Apple core sign (femur)

== B ==
- Bamboo sign
- Banana sign
- Bat wing appearance
- Bear paw sign
- Beveled edge sign
- Bird of prey sign
- Bite sign
- Black pleura sign
- Blade of grass sign (also known as Flame sign)
- Blumensaat's line
- Bohler's angle
- Bone-within-a-bone appearance
- Boomerang sign
- Bow tie appearance
- Bowl of grapes sign
- Bowler hat sign
- Brim sign
- Bucket handle tear
- Bulging fissure sign
- Bunches of grapes sign (hepatic abscess)
- Bunch of grapes sign (botryoid rhabdomyosarcoma)
- Bunch of grapes sign (bronchiectasis)
- Bunch of grapes sign (hydatidiform mole)
- Bunch of grapes sign (intracranial tuberculoma)
- Bunch of grapes sign (intraosseous haemangiomas)
- Bunch of grapes sign (IPMN)
- Bunch of grapes sign (multicystic dysplastic kidney)
- Butterfly vertebra

== C ==
- C sign
- Canga's bead sign
- Cannonball sign
- Cardiothoracic ratio
- Carman meniscus sign
- Celery stalking
- Cervicothoracic sign
- Chang sign
- Cheerio sign
- Cobb angle
- Cobblestone appearance
- Cobra head sign
- Coca cola bottle sign
- Cockade sign
- Codfish vertebra
- Codman's triangle
- Coffee bean sign
- Coin lesion
- Collar button ulcer
- Colon cut-off sign
- Comb sign
- Comet sign
- Comet tail sign (CT thorax)
- Coned epiphyses
- Continuous diaphragm sign
- Cupola sign
- Cord sign
- Corduroy sign
- Corkscrew oesophagus
- Corkscrew sign
- Cortical ring sign
- Cottage loaf sign
- Cotton wool appearance
- Crazy paving sign
- Crescent sign
- Crowded carpal sign
- Cupola sign
- Cœur en sabot

== D ==
- Dagger sign
- Deep lateral femoral notch sign
- Deep sulcus sign
- Dense artery sign
- Dense hilum sign
- Dense MCA sign
- Dense metaphyseal bands
- Dense triangle sign
- Double bronchial wall sign
- Double bubble sign
- Double decidual sign
- Double density sign
- Double duct sign
- Double posterior cruciate ligament sign
- Double track sign
- Doughnut sign
- Draping aorta sign
- Dripping candle wax sign
- Drooping lily sign
- Drooping shoulder sign

== E ==
- Egg on a string sign
- Eggshell calcification (lymph node)
- Eggshell calcification (breast)
- Elephant on a flagpole sign
- Empty lightbulb sign
- Empty sella sign
- Empty vertebral body sign
- Erlenmeyer flask deformity
- Eye of the tiger sign

== F ==
- Fabella sign
- Faceless kidney
- Fairbank's changes
- Falciform ligament sign
- Fallen fragment sign
- Fat pad sign
- Figure 3 sign
- Fishhook ureter
- Flat waist sign
- Floating teeth
- Football sign
- Fragment in notch sign
- Pear shaped breast

== G ==
- Galaxy sign
- Garland's triad
- Ghost vertebrae
- Gilula's lines
- Gloved finger sign
- Goblet sign (ureter)
- Golden's S sign
- Golf ball on a tree sign
- Gooseneck sign
- Ground-glass opacity
- Growth arrest lines
- Gullwing appearance
- Googly eyes sign

== H ==
- H-shaped vertebrae
- Haglund's deformity
- Hair-on-end appearance
- Half moon sign
- Halo sign
- Hamburger bun sign
- Hampton's hump
- Hampton's line
- Harris lines
- Hatchet head
- Head cheese sign
- Hidebound appearance
- High-attenuation crescent sign
- Hilgenreiner's line
- Hill Sach's deformity
- Hilum convergence sign
- Hilum overlay sign
- Holly Leaf sign
- Honda sign
- Honeycombing
- Hot nose sign
- Hot quadrate sign
- Hotcross bun sign
- Hummingbird sign
- Hurricane sign

== I ==
- Ice cream cone sign
- Incomplete fissure sign
- Incomplete rim sign
- Inside out sign
- Insular ribbon sign
- Ivory phalanx sign
- Ivory vertebra

== J ==
- J shaped sella
- Jackstone calculus
- Jail bar sign
- Juxtaphrenic peak sign

== K ==
- Kerley lines
- Keyhole sign (breast)
- Keyhole sign
- Kidney bean sign
- Klein's line
- Klemm's sign
- Knuckle sign

== L ==
- Laminated periosteal reaction
- Lateral capsular sign
- Lateral femoral notch sign
- Lead Pipe fracture
- Leadpipe colon
- Lemon sign
- Leontiasis Ossea
- Licked candy stick appearance
- Light bulb sign
- Linguine sign
- Loosers zone
- Luftsichel sign

== M ==
- MacEwan sign
- Maiden waist deformity
- Mass effect
- Mathe's sign
- Mediastinal shift
- Medusa head sign
- Mercedes Benz sign
- Mickey Mouse ears
- Mickey Mouse pelvis
- Mickey Mouse sign
- Midline shift
- Misty mesentery sign
- Modic changes
- Molar tooth sign
- Moulage sign
- Mumoli's sign

== N ==
- Naked facet sign
- Napoleon hat sign
- Nubbin sign
- Nutcracker fracture

== O ==
- Oil droplet appearance
- Omega sign
- Omental cake
- Onion skin periosteal reaction
- Osteopathia striata
- Osteoporosis circumscripta

== P ==
- Pad sign
- Palla's sign
- Pancake kidney
- Pancake vertebra
- Panda sign
- Pauwel's angle
- Pawnbroker's sign
- Pearshaped bladder
- Pedicle sign
- Pencil Pointing
- Pencil-in-cup sign
- Peribronchial cuffing
- Pericardial fat pad sign
- Perkin's line
- Phantom calyx sign
- Picket fence appearance
- Picture frame sign
- Pie-in-the-sky sign
- Piece of Pie sign
- Playboy sign
- Pneumatosis intestinalis
- Pneumoarthrogram sign
- Polka dot sign
- Popcorn appearance
- Popcorn calcification
- Pseudo Rigler's sign
- Pseudofracture
- Puckered panniculus sign
- Pulmonary consolidation
- Putty kidney
- Pyloric tit sign

== R ==
- Rachitic rosary
- Rarefying osteitis
- Rat bite sign
- Rat tail sign
- Reverse 3 sign
- Reverse hamburger bun sign
- Reverse pulmonary edema
- Reversed batwing sign
- Reversed halo sign
- Rib notching
- Ribbon ribs
- Rice grain calcification
- Rigler's sign
- Ring around artery sign
- Ring enhancing lesion
- Ring sign
- Rod-like calcifications
- Rolled edge sign
- Romanus lesion
- Rugger jersey spine

== S ==
- Saber sheath trachea
- Saber shin deformity
- Sail sign
- Salt and pepper skull
- Sandwich vertebra
- Sausage digit
- Scalloped vertebra
- Scimitar sign
- Scottie dog sign
- Segond fracture
- Sentinel loop
- Shaggy oesophagus
- Shenton's Line
- Shepherd's crook deformity
- Shmoo sign
- Signet ring sign
- Silhouette sign
- Silver fork deformity
- Sister Mary Joseph sign
- Small bowel faeces sign
- Snowcapping appearance
- Snowflake sign
- Snowman sign
- Snowstorm appearance (lung)
- Snowstorm appearance
- Snowstorm pattern (breast)
- Soap bubbly appearance
- Soft tissue rim sign
- Sonographic Murphy sign
- Southwick angle
- Spaghetti sign
- Spalding's sign
- Spilled teacup sign
- Spine sign
- Spinnaker sail sign
- Split pleura sign
- Spoke wheel appearance
- Spotted nephrogram
- Stack of coins appearance
- Steeple sign
- Stepladder appearance
- Stepladder sign
- Stocking glove sign
- String of beads sign (GI)
- String of beads sign
- String of pearls sign
- String sign
- Stripe sign
- Sunburst periosteal reaction
- Superior triangle sign
- Swan neck deformity
- Swirl sign (neuroradiology)
- Swiss cheese appearance (cardiac)

== T ==
- Talar beak
- Target calcification
- Target sign (Gastrointestinal system)
- Target sign (Ultrasound)
- Teacup calcification (breast)
- Teardrop sign
- Terry Thomas Sign
- Threads and streaks sign
- Three sign (cardiac)
- Thumb sign
- Thumbprint sign
- Thurstan Holland sign
- Thymic sail sign
- Tooth sign
- Tram track sign
- Tree in bud sign
- Trethowan's sign
- Trolley track sign
- Trough sign
- Tubular artery sign
- Tulip bulb sign
- Tumbling bullet sign

== U ==
- Upside down stomach sign

== V ==
- Vacuum disk sign
- Vacuum joint
- Vanishing tumor

== W ==
- Water bottle heart
- Water lily sign
- Westermark sign
- Whirlpool sign
- White cerebellum sign
- Wilkinson's syndrome
- Wimberger's ring sign
- Wimberger's sign

== Y ==
- Y Sign
- Yinyang sign
