= Polka dot sign =

Radiological feature of vertebral hemangioma

The polka dot sign is a radiological finding most commonly observed on axial computed tomography (CT) or magnetic resonance imaging (MRI) scans of the spine. It is a hallmark feature of vertebral hemangiomas, a benign vascular tumor of the vertebral body. The sign refers to the appearance of multiple small, dot-like areas of sclerosis or hyperintensity within the vertebral body, resembling a pattern of polka dots.

== Pathophysiology ==
The polka dot sign arises due to the unique structural changes in vertebral hemangiomas. These changes include thickened vertical trabeculae, where they appear as small, discrete dots in axial imaging. There is also vascular proliferation and fat deposition that replaces normal bone marrow. This contributes to the mixed-density appearance of the lesion.

== Imaging characteristics ==
The polka dot sign is best seen in CT imaging as multiple small, circular, sclerotic areas within the vertebral body, representing cross-sections of the thickened vertical trabeculae. The background may appear lucent or hypodense due to vascular spaces and fat replacement. The sagittal view may demonstrate the corduroy sign, which represents vertically oriented striations corresponding to the thickened trabeculae.
