= Pyeloplasty =

Surgical procedure

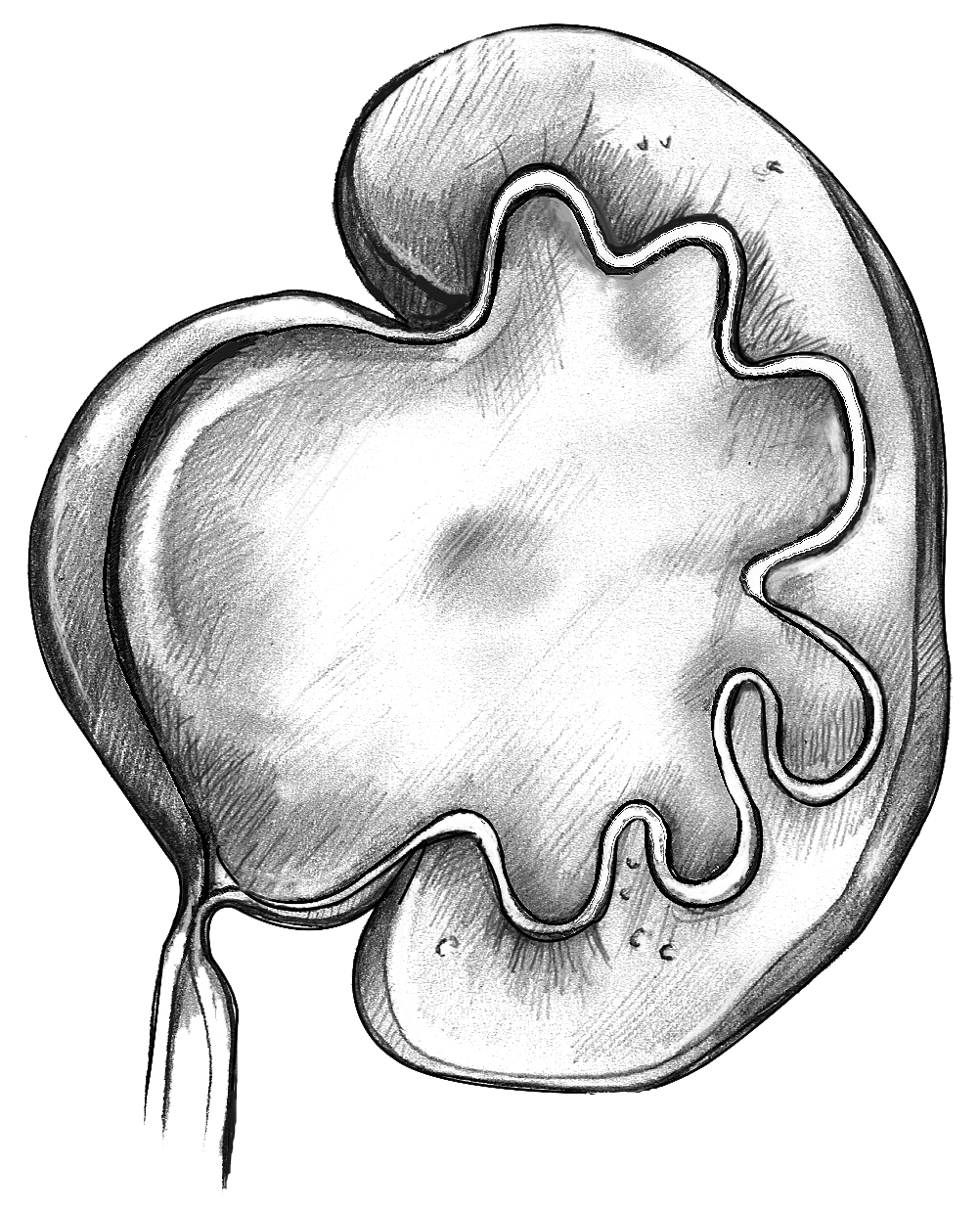
- Drawing of a swollen kidney that results from ureteropelvic junction obstruction
- Specialty: Urologist

Pyeloplasty is a type of surgical procedure performed to treat an uretero-pelvic junction obstruction if residual renal function is adequate.

This revision of the renal pelvis treats the obstruction by excising the stenotic area of the renal pelvis or uretero-pelvic junction and creating a more capacious conduit using the tissue of the remaining ureter and renal pelvis.

There are different types of pyeloplasty depending on the surgical technique and patterns of incision used. These include the Y-V, Inverted 'U', and Dismembered types of pyeloplasty. The dismembered type of pyeloplasty (called an Anderson-Hynes pyeloplasty) is the most common type of pyeloplasty. This was described in relation to retrocaval ureter (now renamed as preureteric vena cava). Another technique of pyeloplasty is Culp's pyeloplasty; in this method a flap is rotated from dilated pelvis to decrease narrowing of ureter.

A pyeloplasty can either be done by the robotic, open, or laparoscopic route.

Anderson–Hynes open pyeloplasty, the upper third of the ureter and the renal pelvis are mobilised, the ureter is dismembered from the renal pelvis, redundant renal pelvis is excised and a new PUJ is reconfigured. A renal vein overlying the distended pelvis can be divided, but an artery in this situation should be preserved to avoid infarction of the renal parenchyma it supplies. The anastomosis is made in front of such an artery if it exists. A ureteric stent is inserted to splint the anastomosis. This type of surgery is now almost universally performed using laparoscopic techniques and in some centres is being performed with robotic assistance. Other surgical procedures have been described to widen the PUJ without dismembering the ureter from the renal pelvis.
