= Sail sign =

Sail sign can refer to:

- Sail sign of the elbow
- Sail sign of the chest
