= Dense MCA sign =

Radiologic sign of brain ischemia

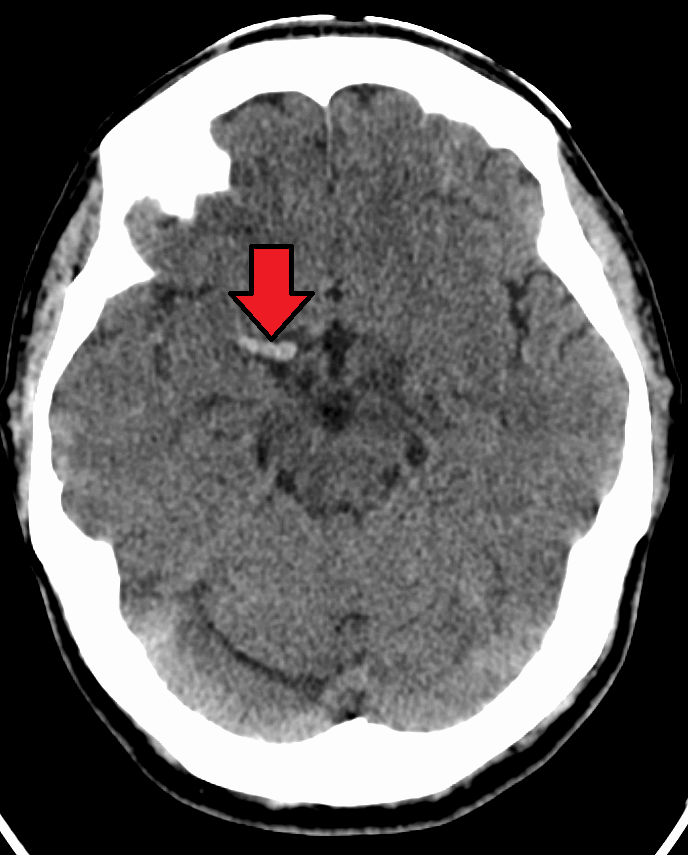
- CT scan without intravenous contrast showing hyperdense aspect of the right middle cerebral artery, indicating thrombus within the vessel
- Specialty: Neuroradiology
- Differential diagnosis: vascular calcification, high hematocrit, artifacts

The dense MCA sign (or hyperdense MCA sign) is a dense artery sign observed on non-contrast computed tomography (CT) of the brain and is an important early marker of acute ischemic stroke involving the middle cerebral artery territory. It refers to an abnormally increased attenuation (hyperdensity) of the MCA, reflecting an intraluminal thrombus or embolus. This sign is also referred to as the hyperdense MCA sign.

== Pathophysiology ==
The dense MCA sign is caused by a fresh thrombus or embolus occluding the lumen of the middle cerebral artery. A thrombus with a high concentration of red blood cells and fibrin has increased density relative to normal flowing blood, leading to its hyperattenuating appearance on a non-contrast CT scan.

The sign typically appears within the first few hours of arterial occlusion, often before visible ischemic changes develop in brain parenchyma. Early recognition of this sign is critical as it allows prompt diagnosis and initiation of treatment to restore perfusion and minimize brain damage.

== Imaging features ==
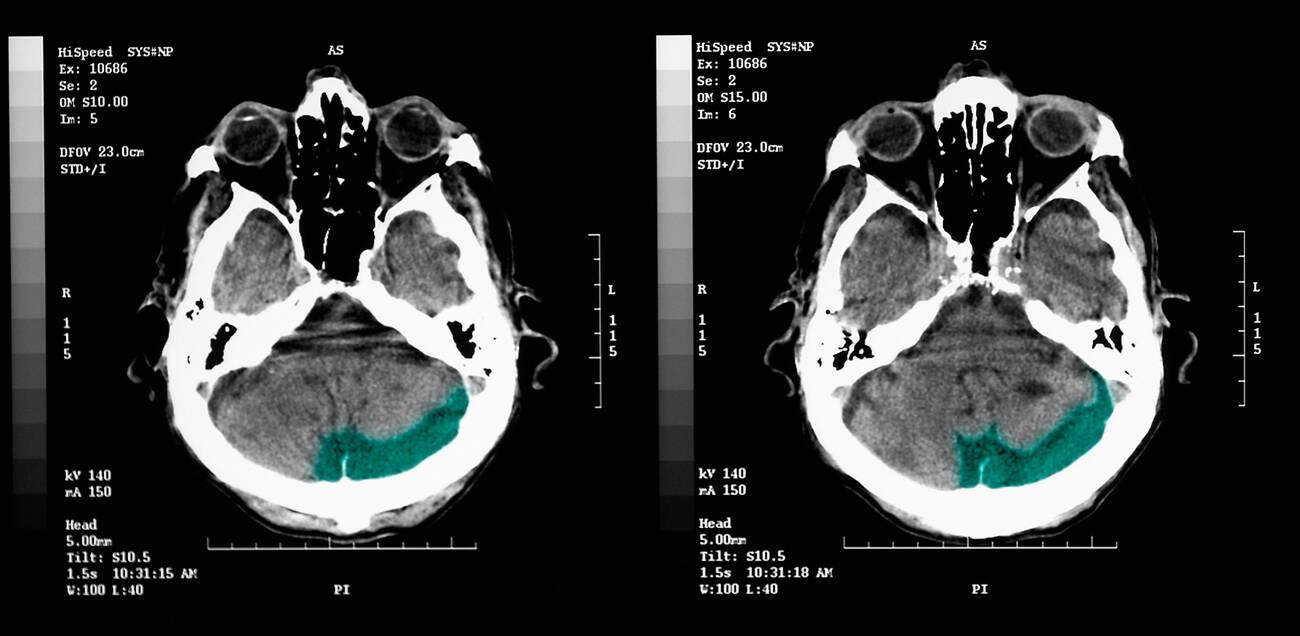
An axial non-contrast CT (NCCT) brain profile on a diagnostic workstation, used for early evaluation of hyperdense linear vascular structures like the dense MCA sign.

Dense MCA sign stands for a hyperdense linear structure located along the course of the middle cerebral artery (MCA), typically in the Sylvian fissure in CT images. The sign may be seen unilaterally (on the affected side) compared to the contralateral MCA, which appears of normal attenuation. The sign is most commonly observed in the M1 segment of the MCA and less commonly in distal branches (M2/M3 segments), where it is termed the hyperdense MCA dot sign. The comparison of thrombus with the unaffected side improves diagnostic accuracy.

== Clinical significance ==
The dense MCA sign is an early indicator of acute ischemic stroke caused by MCA occlusion. Its detection has important clinical implications:

=== Early Diagnosis ===
The dense MCA sign may be the first and only sign of MCA occlusion within the first 1–2 hours of symptom onset, even before parenchymal hypodensity develops. Early recognition enables rapid initiation of treatment, such as intravenous thrombolysis (e.g., tissue plasminogen activator, tPA) or endovascular thrombectomy.

=== Prognosis ===
Presence of the dense MCA sign suggests a large clot burden and is associated with more extensive infarction and worse functional outcomes if reperfusion is not achieved.Prompt recognition of the sign improves the chances of favorable recovery by allowing faster intervention.

== Differential diagnosis ==
Several conditions may mimic the dense MCA sign, leading to false positives. These include:

- Normal vascular calcification: Age-related calcification of the MCA wall can appear hyperdense. However, it tends to be more bilateral and uniform.
- Beam-hardening artifact: Artifacts caused by adjacent bone structures can mimic hyperdensity but are usually less well-defined.
- High hematocrit: Polycythemia or hyperviscosity syndromes may cause slightly increased attenuation of blood vessels.

== Diagnostic limitations ==
The dense MCA sign may not always be present, even in cases of acute MCA occlusion. However, the sign has good sensitivity, and high specificity. Thin-section CT and appropriate windowing (narrow window settings) improve detection.

== Associated findings ==
The dense MCA sign is often accompanied by other early ischemic changes on CT, including:

- Loss of gray-white matter differentiation in the MCA territory (insular ribbon sign).
- Sulcal effacement due to early brain edema.
- Hypodensity of the lentiform nucleus (basal ganglia involvement of ischemia).
