= Osteonectin =

Mammalian protein found in Homo sapiens

SPARC
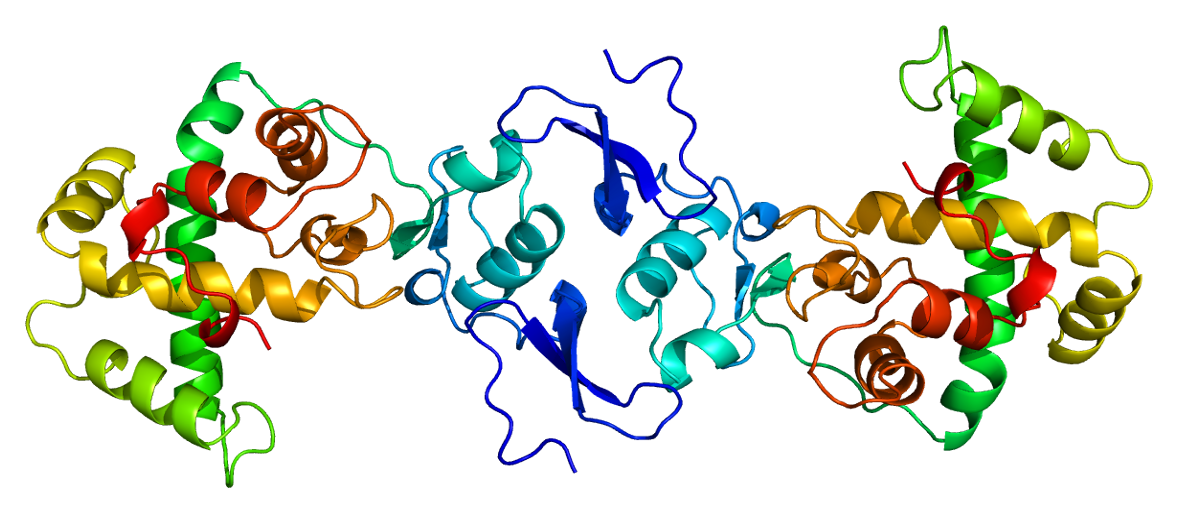

Identifiers
- Aliases: SPARC, BM-40, ON, OI17, secreted protein acidic and cysteine rich, ONT
- External IDs: OMIM: 182120; MGI: 98373; GeneCards: SPARC
Available structures
PDB	Ortholog search: PDBe RCSB
PDB	List of PDB id codes 1BMO, 1NUB, 1SRA, 2V53

Gene location (Human)
Chr.	Chromosome 5 (human)
Band	5q33.1	Start	151,661,096 bp
Band	5q33.1	End	151,686,975 bp

Gene location (Mouse)
Chr.	Chromosome 11 (mouse)
Band	11 B1.3|11 33.04 cM	Start	55,285,326 bp
Band	11 B1.3|11 33.04 cM	End	55,314,009 bp
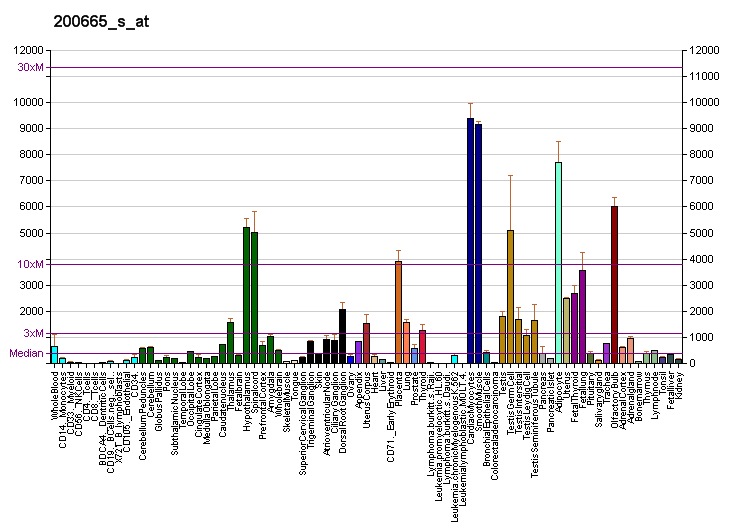

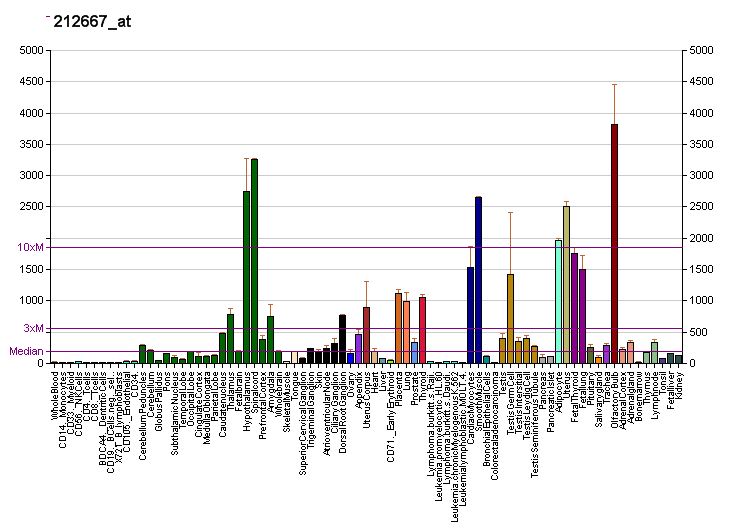
RNA expression pattern
Bgee	Human / Mouse (ortholog); Top expressed in: tibia; stromal cell of endometrium; periodontal fiber; gallbladder; trigeminal ganglion; olfactory bulb; spinal ganglia; visceral pleura; Descending thoracic aorta; smooth muscle tissue / Top expressed in: calvaria; body of femur; ascending aorta; aortic valve; tibiofemoral joint; umbilical cord; stroma of bone marrow; efferent ductule; carotid body; gastrula; More reference expression data
BioGPS	More reference expression data
Gene ontology
Molecular function	calcium ion binding; metal ion binding; protein binding; extracellular matrix binding; collagen binding; extracellular matrix structural constituent
Cellular component	cytoplasm; platelet alpha granule; endocytic vesicle lumen; nuclear matrix; plasma membrane; intracellular anatomical structure; basement membrane; cell surface; platelet alpha granule membrane; mitochondrion; platelet alpha granule lumen; nucleus; extracellular space; vesicle; extracellular region; extracellular matrix; synapse; collagen-containing extracellular matrix; glutamatergic synapse
Biological process	response to cytokine; response to cadmium ion; ossification; lung development; cellular response to growth factor stimulus; response to peptide hormone; platelet degranulation; extracellular matrix organization; response to L-ascorbic acid; response to glucocorticoid; wound healing; receptor-mediated endocytosis; negative regulation of endothelial cell proliferation; positive regulation of endothelial cell migration; response to calcium ion; response to gravity; development of the heart; response to lipopolysaccharide; response to lead ion; regulation of cell population proliferation; negative regulation of angiogenesis; inner ear development; regulation of cell morphogenesis; response to cAMP; response to ethanol; bone development; signal transduction; pigmentation; regulation of synapse organization
Sources:Amigo / QuickGO
Orthologs
Databases	NCBI: entry; OMA: entry
Species	Human	Mouse
Entrez	6678	20692
Ensembl	ENSG00000113140	ENSMUSG00000018593
UniProt	P09486	P07214
RefSeq (mRNA)	NM_003118; NM_001309443; NM_001309444	NM_009242; NM_001290817
RefSeq (protein)	NP_001296372; NP_001296373; NP_003109	NP_001277746; NP_033268
Location (UCSC)	Chr 5: 151.66 – 151.69 Mb	Chr 11: 55.29 – 55.31 Mb
PubMed search
- Wikidata
View/Edit Human	View/Edit Mouse

Osteonectin (ON) also known as secreted protein acidic and rich in cysteine (SPARC) or basement-membrane protein 40 (BM-40) is a protein that in humans is encoded by the SPARC gene.

Osteonectin is a glycoprotein in the bone that binds calcium. It is secreted by osteoblasts during bone formation, initiating mineralization and promoting mineral crystal formation. Osteonectin also shows affinity for collagen in addition to bone mineral calcium. A correlation between osteonectin over-expression and ampullary cancers and chronic pancreatitis has been found.

== Gene ==
The human SPARC gene is 26.5 kb long, and contains 10 exons and 9 introns and is located on chromosome 5q31-q33.

== Structure ==
Osteonectin is a 40 kDa acidic and cysteine-rich glycoprotein consisting of a single polypeptide chain that can be broken into 4 domains: 1) a Ca^{2+} binding domain near the glutamic acid-rich region at the amino terminus (domain I), 2) a cysteine-rich domain (II), 3) a hydrophilic region (domain III), and 4) an EF hand motif at the carboxy terminus region (domain IV).

== Function ==
Osteonectin is an acidic extracellular matrix glycoprotein that plays a vital role in bone mineralization, cell-matrix interactions, and collagen binding. Osteonectin also increases the production and activity of matrix metalloproteinases, a function important to invading cancer cells within bone. Additional functions of osteonectin beneficial to tumor cells include angiogenesis, proliferation and migration. Overexpression of osteonectin is reported in many human cancers such as breast, prostate, colon and pancreatic.

This molecule has been implicated in several biological functions, including mineralization of bone and cartilage, inhibiting mineralization, modulation of cell proliferation, facilitation of acquisition of differentiated phenotype and promotion of cell attachment and spreading.

A number of phosphoproteins and glycoproteins are found in bone. The phosphate is bound to the protein backbone through phosphorylated serine or threonine amino acid residues. The best characterized of these bone proteins is osteonectin. It binds collagen and hydroxyapatite in separate domains, is found in relatively large amounts in immature bone, and promotes mineralization of collagen.

== Tissue distribution ==
Fibroblasts, including periodontal fibroblasts, synthesize osteonectin. This protein is synthesized by macrophages at sites of wound repair and platelet degranulation, so it may play an important role in wound healing. SPARC does not support cell attachment, and like tenascin, is anti-adhesive and an inhibitor of cell spreading. It disrupts focal adhesions in fibroblasts. It also regulates the proliferation of some cells, especially endothelial cells, mediated by its ability to bind to cytokines and growth factors. Osteonectin has also been found to decrease DNA synthesis in cultured bone.

High levels of immunodetectable osteonectin are found in active osteoblasts and marrow progenitor cells, odontoblasts, periodontal ligament and gingival cells, and some chondrocytes and hypertrophic chondrocytes. Osteonectin is also detectable in osteoid, bone matrix proper, and dentin. Osteonectin has been localized in a variety of tissues, but is found in greatest abundance in osseous tissue, tissues characterized by high turnover (such as intestinal epithelium), basement membranes, and certain neoplasms. Osteonectin is expressed by a wide variety of cells, including chondrocytes, fibroblasts, platelets, endothelial cells, epithelial cells, Leydig cells, Sertoli cells, luteal cells, adrenal cortical cells, and numerous neoplastic cell lines (such as SaOS-2 cells from human osteosarcoma).
