= Fishhook ureter sign =

Pattern seen in radiologic examinations

The fishhook ureter sign, also known as the hockey stick sign or the J-shaped ureter sign, is a radiologic sign that has been used to describe the presence of a retrocaval ureter, which is an anatomical anomaly where the ureter abnormally runs posterior to the IVC. This abnormality often results in hydroureter or hydronephrosis.

The fishook ureter sign also describes the appearance of the ureter in patients with bladder outlet obstruction due to benign prostatic hyperplasia (BPH).
