= Licked candy stick appearance =

Pattern seen in radiologic examinations

The licked candy stick appearance is a radiologic sign observed on bone radiographs that refers to the tapering of the tips of the hand bones (metacarpals and phalanges), foot bones (metatarsals), or clavicles that occurs in conditions such as psoriatic arthritis, rheumatoid arthritis, and leprosy.
