= Absent bowtie sign =

Pattern seen in radiologic examinations

The absent bowtie sign is a radiologic sign indicative of a meniscal tear in the knee joint. On sagittal magnetic resonance (MR) images, the body of the meniscus normally looks like a bow tie, with two distinct segments. The absent bowtie sign is present when there is a lack of two segments seen on consecutive sagittal MR images. This sign can be used to diagnose "bucket-handle" tears of the menisci, which are longitudinal tears with displaced fragment(s). The "handle" is created when the inner meniscal fragment is displaced into the intercondylar notch.
