= Anteater nose sign =

Pattern seen in radiologic examinations

The anteater nose sign is a radiologic sign characterized by a tubular extension of the anterior process of the calcaneus bone that either extends towards or overlaps the navicular bone. This sign indicates the presence of a calcaneonavicular tarsal coalition, which is an inherited congenital malformation of the foot. In this condition, there are abnormal bony, cartilaginous, or fibrous connections between the bones of the hindfoot, midfoot, or both regions.
