= Cheerio sign =

Pattern seen during radiologic examination

The Cheerio sign is a radiologic sign that has been used to describe both pulmonary nodules and tears in the glenoid labrum, named after its resemblance to the popular breakfast cereal Cheerios.

On computed tomography (CT) of the chest, the Cheerio sign is seen as a ring-like structure with central lucency within the lung. This sign most commonly indicates the presence of pulmonary adenocarcinoma or Langerhans cell histiocytosis, but differential diagnosis includes granulomatosis with polyangitis, rheumatoid nodules and infections.

The Cheerio sign has also been demonstrated on CT arthrograms of the shoulder in cases of anterior and posterior tears in the superior part of the glenoid labrum. These tears are called SLAP lesions (superior labrum; anterior, posterior). This sign is specifically seen in type 3 SLAP lesions, which involve a "bucket-handle" tear of predominately the anterior labrum, often with displacement into the joint. On CT, this appears as a ring of contrast material and air surrounding a core of soft tissue.
