= Dripping candle wax sign =

Radiologic sign

The dripping candle wax sign is a radiologic sign seen on X-rays of bone that indicates melorheostosis (or Leri disease), a rare benign bone disease characterized by bone hypertrophy, dysplasia, and sclerosis. Sclerosis typically affects one side of the cortex of the involved bone, appearing similar to wax melting down one side of a candle. Melorheostosis most commonly affects the long bones of the upper and lower extremities, but can also be seen in the hands and feet. It is usually an incidental finding and most patients are asymptomatic.
