= Falciform ligament sign =

Radiologic sign seen in pneumoperitoneum

The falciform ligament sign is a radiological sign observed on abdominal imaging in cases of pneumoperitoneum, where free intraperitoneal air outlines the falciform ligament. This sign is considered a diagnostic indicator of free air within the abdominal cavity and is most commonly identified on computed tomography (CT) scans and less frequently in abdominal radiographs.

== Anatomy ==
The falciform ligament is a double-layered fold of peritoneum that connects the anterior abdominal wall to the anterosuperior surface of the liver. It contains the ligamentum teres (a remnant of the umbilical vein) in its free edge and lies within the midline, extending from the umbilicus to the inferior surface of the diaphragm. Under normal conditions, the falciform ligament is not visible on CT imaging unless surrounded by free air or fluid.

== Computed Tomography findings ==
On CT, falciform ligament is seen as a linear high-attenuation structure outlined by low-attenuation free air. There may be associated findings such as the site for perforation or underlying pathology.
