= Double duct sign =

Radiologic sign

The double duct sign is a radiological finding characterized by the simultaneous dilation of the common bile duct and the main pancreatic duct. This sign is significant because it often indicates an obstruction in the distal bile duct and pancreatic duct, frequently caused by serious underlying pathologies such as pancreatic carcinoma or periampullary tumors. The double duct sign is most commonly visualized on imaging modalities such as computed tomography, magnetic resonance imaging, or endoscopic retrograde cholangiopancreatography.

== Pathophysiology ==
The double duct sign results from the anatomical convergence of the biliary and pancreatic ducts at the ampulla of Vater, where obstructions can disrupt the drainage of both systems simultaneously. Common causes of such obstructions include pancreatic adenocarcinoma, periampullary cancer, cholangiocarcinoma, chronic pancreatitis, gallstone-related obstruction and strictures.

== Imaging features ==
- Ultrasound: May show dilated common bile duct and main pancreatic duct, but is less reliable in visualizing both ducts simultaneously.
- Computed Tomography: Non-contrast and contrast-enhanced CT may demonstrate dilation of both ducts and identify an underlying mass in the pancreas or ampulla, if present.
- Magnetic Resonance Cholangiopancreatography (MRCP): Non-invasive procedure, that clearly shows dilated CBD and MPD and may help pinpoint the obstruction site.
- Endoscopic Retrograde Cholangiopancreatography (ERCP): A diagnostic and therapeutic tool, ERCP provides high-resolution imaging of the biliary and pancreatic ducts. It is particularly useful for biopsy or stenting if malignancy is suspected.
- Endoscopic Ultrasound (EUS): Combines high-resolution imaging with the ability to perform fine-needle aspiration for tissue diagnosis.

== Clinical significance ==
The double duct sign is a red flag finding in radiology, with malignancies accounting for the majority of cases. Early identification is crucial for diagnosis, staging in case of malignancy, management and for performing therapeutic interventions.
