= Brim sign =

Radiologic sign

The brim sign or the pelvic brim sign is a radiologic sign seen in cases of Paget's disease of bone involving the pelvis. It refers to thickened and sclerotic changes along the iliopubic line, the anteromedial portion of the pelvic brim. This sign is a key diagnostic marker for pelvic involvement in Paget's disease and is typically identified on plain radiographs.

== Pathophysiology ==
Paget's disease of bone is a chronic disorder characterized by abnormal bone remodeling. The pelvic brim sign arises due to excessive bone resorption due to increased osteoclastic activity in the early stages of the disease leads to localized bone loss, as well as excessive bone formation during the later stages of the diseases. Compensatory osteoblastic activity results in thickened, sclerotic bone along the iliopubic line.

The pelvic brim, being a weight-bearing area, shows pronounced changes, including thickening and increased density. These changes manifest radiologically as sclerosis and cortical thickening along the pelvic brim, creating the characteristic sign.
