= Maiden waist deformity =

Pattern seen in radiologic examinations

The maiden waist deformity is a radiologic sign associated with retroperitoneal fibrosis, a condition resulting from the abnormal proliferation of fibrous tissue in the retroperitoneal space. The fibrosis can extend to adjacent anatomical structures, frequently encompassing and obstructing the ureters. This sign refers to the alteration in the normal course of the ureters: when the fibrosis causes both ureters to be pulled medially, they may form the appearance of a "narrow-waisted maiden".
