= Aortic nipple sign =

Pattern seen in radiologic examinations

The aortic nipple sign is a radiologic sign that describes the appearance of the left superior intercostal vein on chest radiography. The left superior intercostal vein is located next to the aortic arch, appearing on radiographs as a small mass (or "nipple") projecting from the arch. This sign is seen in a small number of individuals and may be mistaken for lymphadenopathy or a neoplasm. The aortic nipple sign may be helpful in identifying certain thoracic pathologies, such as pneumomediastinum, as it may change in size due to changes in intrathoracic pressure. Its appearance is also affected by changes in posture and vascular flow.
