= Celery stalking =

Pattern seen in radiologic examinations

Celery stalking or celery stalk metaphysis refers to the appearance of longitudinally aligned linear sclerotic bands extending from the epiphysis of the long bones. This finding is seen in conditions such as osteopathia striata, congenital rubella and congenital syphilis.
