= Mumoli's sign =

Radiologic sign

Mumoli's sign (also known as a "Playboy Rabbit" sign) is a radiologic sign seen in the normal liver. It appears as a rabbit-shaped image caused by the confluence of the middle and right hepatic veins as they merge with the inferior vena cava. It can be seen on ultrasound images of the liver with a transverse subcostal view during deep inspiration.

The image was named after Nicola Mumoli of the Department of Internal Medicine, Livorno Hospital, Livorno, Italy.

== External image ==
- "Playboy Rabbit" sign image
