= Fat pad =

Encapsulated adipose tissue

A fat pad (aka haversian gland) is a mass of closely packed fat cells surrounded by fibrous tissue septa. They may be extensively supplied with capillaries and nerve endings.

Examples are:

- Intraarticular fat pads. These are also covered by a layer of synovial cells. A fat pad sign is an elevation of the anterior and posterior fat pads of the elbow joint, and suggests the presence of an occult fracture.
- Buccal fat pad can be seen in nursing babies.
- The fat pad of the labia majora, which can be used as a graft, often as a so-called "Martius labial fat pad graft", which can be used, for example, in urethrolysis.
- Fat pads within the heels which when they get inflamed can cause heel pad syndrome
- The pads under the balls of the feet.
- The eight pairs of focal fat pads running from the armpit to the groin found in all lean women and men in a curved linear arrangement identical to the mammary ridge lines seen in human embryos.
