= Holly leaf sign =

Pattern seen in radiologic examinations

Sagittal Radiograph of a retired pipe fitter experiencing early Asbestosis, showing the tell-tale holly leaf like edges of the calcified plueral plaques in their lungs.

The holly leaf sign is a radiologic sign observed on chest radiographs that has been used to describe the appearance of pleural plaques typically resulting from asbestos exposure. The irregular margins of a calcified pleural plaque are known to resemble the spikey edges of a holly leaf.
