= Luftsichel sign =

Radiologic sign in chest X-ray

Luftsichel sign (from the German word meaning “air crescent”) is a classic radiographic sign seen on chest imaging, on plain radiographs, and is associated with left upper lobe collapse. It is seen as a collection of hyperlucent air outlining the medial aspect of the collapsed left upper lobe. The etiology of Luftsichel sign are luminal (such as a mucus plug in the left upper lobe bronchus), mural (such as a bronchogenic carcinoma) and extrinsic (such as bronchial compression) causes, with bronchogenic carcinoma being the most frequent etiology.

== Radiologic Appearance ==
On a chest radiograph, the Luftsichel sign appears as a crescent-shaped hyperlucent area (the “air sickle”) located between the aortic arch and the medial border of the collapsed left upper lobe. This is formed by the hyperinflation of the superior segment of the left lower lobe, which shifts upward and fills the space vacated by the collapsing upper lobe. The presence of this sign is suggestive of upper lobe volume loss and is never seen after lower lobe lobectomy. In lateral projection, a raised retrosternal density with anterior displacement of the major fissure is usually seen, suggesting left upper lobe collapse.

== Differential diagnosis ==
The differential diagnosis is right lung hernia and mediastinal pneumothroax in chest imaging. In case of right lung herniation, the right lung herniates retrosternally, and due to this, parasternal hyperlucency can be observed. In mediastinal pneumothorax, there would be no other signs of collapse and there may be pneumothorax or subcutaneous emphysema along with it.

== History ==
Luftsichel sign was first described in 1942.
