= Hotcross bun sign =

Radiologic sign

The hotcross bun sign is a radiologic sign observed on transverse T2-weighted magnetic resonance (MR) images of the brain, describing a cross-shaped (or cruciform) hyperintensity within the pons. This sign is most commonly associated with the cerebellar subtype of multiple system atrophy (MSA-c). It is also associated with spinocerebellar ataxia, progressive multifocal leukoencephalopathy, paraneoplastic cerebellar degeneration, and Creutzfeldt-Jakob disease.
