= Sail sign of the chest =

Pattern seen in radiologic examinations

- Differential diagnosis: left lower lobe collapse

On a chest X-ray, the sail sign is a radiologic sign that suggests left lower lobe collapse. In children, however, a sail sign could be normal, reflecting the shadow of the thymus.

The thymic sail sign or spinnaker-sail sign is due to elevation of the thymic lobes in the setting of pneumomediastinum.
