= Bear paw sign =

Pattern seen during radiologic examination

The bear paw sign is a radiologic sign that describes the appearance of xanthogranulomatous pyelonephritis on computer tomography (CT) scans. Xanthogranulomatous pyelonephritis is a rare type of chronic pyelonephritis where the damaged areas of the kidneys are replaced by foam cells. On CT, multiloculated hypoattenuating masses with bright rim enhancement may be seen in the renal parenchyma, resembling the toe pads of a bear's paw. These masses are indicative of dilated renal calyces and xanthomas.
