= Comb sign =

Radiologic sign in bowel inflammation

The comb sign is a radiological sign seen on computed tomography or magnetic resonance imaging scans, primarily used to identify inflammation in the mesentery. It refers to the appearance of engorged mesenteric vessels resembling the teeth of a comb, which is a key feature seen in several abdominal conditions, particularly those associated with inflammatory bowel diseases, such as Crohn's disease. This sign was first described by Morton Mayers.

== Description ==
The comb sign is characterized by the appearance of dilated, prominent vessels in the mesentery of the abdomen, which appears similar to the teeth of a comb. These engorged vessels result from inflammation and increased blood flow in the mesenteric vessels, which is a common response to acute or chronic inflammatory conditions in the gastrointestinal tract.

This sign is most often seen in patients with Crohn's disease but can also be associated with other conditions that cause mesenteric inflammation.

== Imaging features ==
The mesentery may appear thickened, and the mesenteric vessels (which supply blood to the intestines) become dilated and appear to resemble a comb. This sign is best seen in the small intestine or colon and can be associated with peripheral fat stranding or mesenteric fat changes indicative of active inflammation. This sign is helpful in determining the acuity of the inflammatory process.
