= Bowler hat sign =

Pattern seen during radiologic examination

The bowler hat sign is a radiologic sign seen on double-contrasted barium enema studies, indicating the presence of a colonic polyp. A ring of barium collects at the base of the polyp and also along its dome, simulating the appearance of a bowler hat. This sign is present for growths that are an intermediate between flat and pedunculated. The differential diagnosis for this sign includes bubbles, diverticula, and unusual projections of anatomic structures such as the appendix.
