= Spilled teacup sign =

Radiologic sign

The spilled teacup sign is a radiologic sign seen on lateral wrist radiographs, in which the lunate bone is rotated or tilted volarly, so that its concave articular surface faces anteriorly and downward rather than cradling the capitate bone. This gives the appearance of a teacup being spilled. It is diagnostic of a lunate dislocation.
