= J-shaped sella sign =

Radiologic sign

The J-shaped sella sign is a radiologic sign observed on lateral views of skull radiographs as the forward elongation of the sella turcica, and its extension below the anterior clinoid process. This abnormality causes the sella turcica to resemble the letter J. This sign is a normal variant in 5% of children, but it is also associated with optic nerve glioma, hydrocephalus, mucopolysaccharidoses, and achondroplasia.
