= Teacup calcification (breast) =

Radiologic sign

Teacup calcifications, also known as the "teacup sign," are a specific radiologic sign indicative of benign breast conditions, particularly milk of calcium within cysts. These calcifications exhibit a distinctive appearance on mammography, helping radiologists in distinguishing benign entities from malignant ones.

== Radiological appearance ==
When horizontal x-ray beams, commonly used in lateral projections, are used to image the breast, the fluid inside the cysts, such as milk of calcium, is imaged tangentially. This technique often produces linear or curvilinear patterns of calcification. In some cases, a semilunar shape may appear, which is why this sign is called "teacup sign."

== Diagnosis ==
Teacup calcifications are typically benign and do not require follow up or sampling, per the American College of Radiology BI-RADS recommendation.
