= Eye of the tiger sign =

Radiologic sign

The eye of the tiger sign is a radiologic sign observed on T2-weighted magnetic resonance (MR) images of the brain. It appears as a central area of hyperintense signal surrounded by a ring of hypointensity in the anteromedial part of the globus pallidus. The eye of the tiger sign is recognized as a diagnostic feature of pantothenate kinase associated neurodegeneration, previously known as Hallervorden-Spatz syndrome. This is a neurodegenerative disorder associated with excess iron accumulation in the brain. The hypointense area is thought to be caused by the excess iron while the central hyperintensity is possibly a result of gliosis.
