= Colon cut-off sign =

Radiologic sign

The colon cut-off sign is a radiographic finding seen on abdominal radiographs and computed tomography scans. It is characterized by a marked dilatation of the transverse colon, with an abrupt transition to collapsed distal colon, particularly the splenic flexure. This sign is indicative of underlying pathology, most commonly acute pancreatitis.

== Pathophysiology ==
The colon cut-off sign is due to local inflammation or irritation. In acute pancreatitis, the inflammatory process involving the pancreas and surrounding tissues can extend to the adjacent transverse colon through the phrenicocolic ligament. This inflammation leads to spasm and localized ileus, causing a sharp demarcation between the dilated proximal bowel and the collapsed distal segment.

== Clinical significance ==
- Acute Pancreatitis: The most common condition associated with the colon cut-off sign. The proximity of the inflamed pancreas to the transverse colon and splenic flexure results in localized inflammation, which leads to the characteristic radiographic appearance.
- Other Conditions: Though less common, other causes can include splenic infarction, colonic ischemia, or trauma, which similarly result in localized inflammatory changes and bowel spasm.

== Imaging characteristics ==
- Abdominal Radiographs: Show a dilated transverse colon with an abrupt transition at the splenic flexure. This appearance can mimic colonic obstruction.
- CT Scans: More sensitive and specific than abdominal radiograph, revealing the extent of colonic dilatation, the transition point, and often associated peripancreatic inflammation or fluid collections.

The colon cut-off sign is different from sentinel loop sign, where the dilated segment is a part of the small intestine.
