= Gloved finger sign =

Radiologic sign

The gloved finger sign is a radiologic sign observed on chest radiographs or CT scans that indicates the presence of mucoid impaction in the lungs. Mucoid impaction occurs when bronchi become dilated and filled with mucus. This abnormality appears as branching tubular opacities projecting out from the hila towards the periphery of the lungs, resembling gloved fingers. The gloved finger sign has been observed in the imaging of several conditions, including bronchial atresia, cystic fibrosis, bronchiectasis, allergic bronchopulmonary aspergillosis, foreign body aspiration, benign tumors, and malignancies.
