= Medusa head sign (neuroradiology) =

Radiological sign

The medusa head sign, also called the caput medusae sign, is a radiological appearance in which a number of small medullary veins are arranged radially and converge on a single larger collecting vein, resembling the snake-covered head of Medusa of Greek mythology. It is the characteristic appearance of a developmental venous anomaly (DVA) of the brain and is seen on contrast-enhanced CT and MRI, being most obvious when the imaging plane lies perpendicular to the collecting vein.

Developmental venous anomalies are the most common vascular malformation of the brain. They are usually found incidentally and are mostly benign, though they are sometimes associated with a cerebral cavernous malformation.

The sign should not be confused with the caput medusae of portal hypertension, which refers to distended veins radiating from the navel.
