= Bat wing appearance =

Radiologic sign

Bat wing appearance is a radiologic sign referring to bilateral perihilar lung shadowing seen in frontal chest X-ray and in chest CT. The most common reason for bat wing appearance is the accumulation of oedema fluid in the lungs. The batwing sign is symmetrical, usually showing ground glass appearance and spares the lung cortices. This sign is seen in individuals with pneumonia, inhalation injuries, pulmonary haemorrhage, sarcoidosis, bronchoalveolar carcinoma, rapid onset heart failure and pulmonary alveolar proteinosis. It is also referred to as 'butterfly wing' or 'angel wing' due to the likenesses between the wings.
