= Leadpipe colon =

Radiologic sign in inflammatory bowel disease

Leadpipe colon is a term used in radiology to describe a specific, characteristic appearance of the colon, typically seen on barium enema radiographs. The term is associated with a rigid, non-distensible colon that has lost its normal haustral folds, presenting a smooth, tubular, or "pipe-like" appearance. This condition is most commonly linked to chronic ulcerative colitis and other forms of inflammatory bowel disease.

== Description ==
In the leadpipe colon appearance, the colon appears straight and narrowed, with the absence of the usual haustral folds. Haustral folds are typically seen in the colon as segmental pouches or folds that help segment the large bowel. In leadpipe colon, these folds are obliterated or flattened, resulting in a smooth appearance. The colon takes on a rigid, tubular form, similar to a pipe, which is where the term "leadpipe" comes from, likening the colon to the appearance of a lead pipe.

== Radiological appearance ==
The classic leadpipe colon appearance is best observed on barium enema studies, a type of contrast X-ray imaging. During a barium enema, a contrast agent (barium sulfate) is introduced into the colon, and X-ray images are taken. In a leadpipe colon, the following features are seen:

- Loss of haustral folds: The normally visible pouches or folds (haustra) that segment the colon are absent or flattened.
- Smooth, straight appearance of colon: The colon appears rigid and smooth, with little to no flexibility or segmentation.
- Narrowing of the colon: In some cases, the colon may appear narrowed or constricted due to fibrosis from chronic inflammation.
