= Sentinel loop =

Pattern seen in radiologic examinations

- Differential diagnosis: acute cholecystitis, acute pancreatis

A sentinel loop is a sign seen on a radiograph that indicates localized ileus from nearby inflammation. Simply put, it is the dilation of a segment of small intestine to be differentiated from colonic cutoff sign which is a dilation of a segment of large bowel.

An isolated distended loop of bowel is seen near the site of injured viscus or inflamed organ. This loop is called a "sentinel loop." It arises from the body's efforts to localize traumatic or inflammatory lesions. The local distention of that intestinal loop is due to local paralysis and accumulation of gas in the intestinal loop. In acute pancreatitis, the sentinel loop is usually seen in the left hypochondrium, while in acute cholecystitis, it is seen in the right hypochondrium. In acute appendicitis, the sentinel loop is seen in the right lower quadrant.
