= Rice grain calcification =

Calcification pattern in cysticercosis

Rice grain calcification is a distinctive radiological finding characterized by the presence of small, elongated, or oval calcific foci resembling grains of rice. This pattern of calcification is typically observed in soft tissues and is associated with certain infectious or inflammatory conditions. It is most commonly linked to cysticercosis, a parasitic infection caused by the larval form of Taenia solium.

== Pathophysiology ==
In cysticercosis, the calcifications represent the remnants of degenerated larvae of Taenia solium. When the larvae die, they become calcified over time, forming the characteristic rice grain-like appearance.

== Imaging features ==
- Plain Radiography: Appears as multiple, small, oval or linear calcific densities within the soft tissues, commonly seen in muscle groups such as the thighs, arms, or chest wall.
- Computed Tomography (CT): Provides greater detail regarding the location, shape, and extent of calcifications. Calcifications may appear dispersed throughout affected muscle groups or in specific regions.
- Ultrasound: Hyper-echoic foci with posterior acoustic shadowing may be seen, representing calcified cysticerci.
- Magnetic Resonance Imaging (MRI): Less useful for identifying calcifications directly but may show the residual inflammatory changes in adjacent tissues.
