= Swirl sign =

CT sign of brain bleeding

The swirl sign is a finding on noncontrast computed tomography in which an area of low attenuation lies within an otherwise high-attenuation (hyperattenuating) hematoma. The low-attenuation region is fresh, uncoagulated blood, which is less dense than the surrounding clotted blood, and its presence indicates that the hematoma is still actively bleeding. The sign is most often described in acute epidural (extradural) hematoma after head trauma.

Recognising the swirl sign is important in radiology because it marks a hematoma that is expanding, which can raise intracranial pressure and lead to brain herniation; identifying it prompts urgent surgical evacuation. In a surgical series of acute epidural hematomas the sign was present in about 14% of cases and was an independent predictor of poor outcome. The same appearance has also been described in intracerebral hemorrhage, where it is associated with subsequent hematoma expansion.
