= Klemm's sign =

Pattern seen during radiologic examination

- Differential diagnosis: chronic appendicitis

Klemm's sign, also known as air cushion sign, is a sign of chronic appendicitis.
