= Putty kidney =

Radiologic sign in renal tuberculosis

Putty kidney is a radiological term describing a calcified kidney typically seen in the end stages of chronic renal tuberculosis. The term "putty kidney" derives from the radiographic appearance of extensive amorphous calcification within the kidney, resembling the consistency of putty. This finding is a hallmark of advanced genitourinary tuberculosis, which is one of the types of extrapulmonary tuberculosis. The term 'putty kidney' was first used in 1906 by Dr. F Tilden Brown, a genitourinary surgeon.

== Pathophysiology ==
Putty kidney represents the late-stage sequelae of renal tuberculosis, which results from hematogenous dissemination of Mycobacterium tuberculosis to the kidneys. Chronic inflammation and granuloma formation lead to:

- Parenchymal destruction: The renal tissue undergoes caseous necrosis, fibrosis, and calcification.
- Fibrosis and shrinkage: Progressive scarring results in a small, irregularly shaped kidney.
- Calcification: Deposition of calcium salts within the necrotic tissue leads to the characteristic dense appearance of the kidney on imaging.

The advanced calcified state of a putty kidney is associated with a loss of renal function and often coexists with damage to the ureters and bladder.

== Imaging characteristics ==
=== Plain radiography ===
Dense, amorphous calcifications occupying the renal region.

=== Computed Tomography ===
- Calcifications: Extensive, coarse calcifications replacing the normal renal parenchyma.
- Shrunken Kidney: Significant reduction in kidney size with irregular contours.
- Surrounding Structures: May show associated calcification in the ureters or bladder due to tuberculosis involvement.

=== Ultrasound ===
- Hyperechoic areas corresponding to calcifications.
- Loss of normal corticomedullary differentiation.
