= Corduroy sign =

Radiologic sign seen in vertebral hemangioma

The corduroy sign is a radiological finding observed on spinal imaging in cases of vertebral hemangiomas. It refers to a striated or vertically oriented linear pattern seen on imaging, resembling the appearance of corduroy fabric. This sign is most commonly identified on lateral radiographs or magnetic resonance imaging (MRI) of the spine and is an important diagnostic marker for benign conditions such as vertebral hemangiomas. Patients with the typical ‘corduroy appearance’ is extremely rare clinically.

== Pathophysiology ==
Vertebral hemangiomas are benign vascular tumors that occur within the vertebral bodies. They arise due to a proliferation of thin-walled blood vessels within the bone and are often asymptomatic. The corduroy sign reflects characteristic trabecular changes caused by the hemangioma, namely, thinning of trabeculae as well as thickened vertical struts, resulting from compensatory hypertrophy of the remaining trabeculae to maintain structural integrity. These vertical trabecular striations give rise to the "corduroy" appearance on imaging.

== Imaging findings ==
On lateral radiographs and sagittal computed tomography (CT) of the spine, the corduroy sign appears as vertical linear striations, which are alternating bands of radiolucency (representing vascular spaces) and radiodensity (representing thickened trabeculae) within the vertebral body. The vertebral body typically retains its normal shape and size unless the lesion becomes aggressive.
