= Continuous diaphragm sign =

Radiologic sign of free gas

The continuous diaphragm sign is a radiological finding seen on chest X-rays that indicates the presence of gas within the thoracic cavity, specifically in the mediastinum (pneumomediastinum), the peritoneal cavity (pneumoperitoneum) or pericardium (pneumopericardium). This sign is characterized by the uninterrupted visualization of the diaphragm's contour across the midline, underlining both the right and left hemidiaphragms, which is normally obscured by the overlying heart and mediastinum.

== Pathophysiology ==
The diaphragm typically appears as two separate, curved outlines (hemidiaphragms) on a chest X-ray due to the heart and mediastinum obscuring its central portion. When air accumulates in the mediastinum or peritoneal cavity, it outlines the diaphragm, making its central portion visible and creating the appearance of a continuous line. The continuous diaphragm sign is most commonly caused by the presence of free air in the mediastinum where air escapes from the lungs, airways, or other mediastinal structures. The causes for pneumomediastinum include trauma, alveolar rupture, asthma exacerbations, or esophageal perforation. The sign can also be seen in pneumoperitoneum, where free air enters the abdominal cavity due to gastrointestinal perforation or surgery.
