= Cannonball sign =

Radiologic sign in disseminated cancer

The cannonball sign is a radiological term used to describe the presence of multiple, well-circumscribed, round opacities seen on X-ray or CT imaging, typically in the lungs. This finding is most commonly associated with hematogenous metastases, where malignant cells spread to the lungs via the bloodstream, forming discrete nodules that resemble cannonballs. The term "cannonball" reflects the large, rounded appearance of these lesions, often evident on chest radiographs or CT scans.

== Pathophysiology ==
Cannonball metastases result from the hematogenous dissemination of malignant cells, where tumor emboli travel through the bloodstream and lodge in the pulmonary vasculature. The lungs are a frequent site of metastases due to their rich vascular supply and filtration of venous blood. The characteristic rounded nodules represent distinct tumor foci that grow in a non-infiltrative pattern.

This pattern is typically associated with malignancies that produce well-demarcated metastatic deposits rather than diffuse infiltrative changes. The size and number of nodules can vary depending on the primary tumor and the extent of metastatic spread.

== Imaging features ==
=== Chest radiograph ===
Chest radiograph shows multiple, rounded opacities of varying sizes, typically bilateral but may be unilateral in early stages. Lesions are well-defined, mimicking cannonballs.

=== Computed tomography ===
CT has greater sensitivity in detecting small or early nodules. Nodules are round, well-circumscribed, and randomly distributed. The nodules may reveal additional features such as necrosis or calcification, depending on the tumor type.

=== MRI and PET-CT ===
Rarely used for initial identification but can assess metastatic activity, especially in borderline or ambiguous cases.

== Clinical implications ==
Cannonball metastases are classically seen in renal cell carcinoma, also seen in choriocarcinoma, endometrial cancer, prostate cancer and some gastrointestinal malignancies. The presence of cannonball metastases is a hallmark of advanced systemic malignancy. Identification of these lesions often triggers search for primary tumor. Detailed history, physical examination, and further imaging studies (e.g., abdominal or pelvic CT, mammography) are needed to locate the primary malignancy. Biopsy may be performed to confirm the metastatic origin and histopathology, particularly if the primary tumor is unknown. Cannonball metastases often indicate a poor prognosis, reflecting widespread disease.
