= Black pleura sign =

Radiologic sign in pulmonary alveolar microlithiasis

The black pleura sign is a radiological feature observed in pulmonary alveolar microlithiasis (PAM), a rare lung disorder characterized by the accumulation of tiny calcium phosphate deposits, known as microliths, within the alveoli. This sign appears as a thin, dark (lucent) line beneath the ribs on imaging studies, contrasting with the diffusely dense, calcified lung parenchyma.

== Pathophysiology ==
In PAM, microliths predominantly accumulate in the central portions of secondary pulmonary lobules, leading to widespread calcification of the lung tissue. However, the subpleural regions often remain relatively spared from these deposits and sometimes show subpleural cystic changes. This subpleural sparing creates a peripheral zone that appears less dense (more lucent) on imaging studies, resulting in the black pleura sign.

== Imaging characteristics ==
- Chest radiography: On plain chest X-rays, the black pleura sign manifests as a thin, dark line just beneath the ribs. This line stands out against the adjacent, uniformly dense lung fields caused by extensive calcifications.
- Computed Tomography (CT): CT scans provide a more detailed view, revealing a clear demarcation between the calcified lung parenchyma and the spared subpleural area. The black pleura sign is evident as a peripheral lucent rim beneath the pleura, highlighting the contrast between the dense, calcified lung tissue and the less affected subpleural region.

== Clinical significance ==
The black pleura sign is considered a characteristic indicator of pulmonary alveolar microlithiasis. Its presence on imaging studies can aid radiologists and clinicians in differentiating PAM from other interstitial lung diseases that may not exhibit subpleural sparing.
