= Cockade sign =

Radiologic sign in intraosseous lipoma

The cockade sign is a radiological feature associated with intraosseous lipoma, a rare benign tumor of the bone composed primarily of mature adipose tissue. This sign describes the characteristic appearance of a central calcification or ossification surrounded by radiolucent fatty tissue on imaging, resembling a bullseye or cockade.

== Pathogenesis ==
Intraosseous lipomas are thought to arise from the proliferation of adipose tissue within the medullary cavity of bone. Over time, ischemic changes within the lesion may lead to necrosis, calcification, or cystic transformation. These secondary changes are responsible for the imaging characteristics, including the cockade sign. The cockade sign develops due to central calcification or ossification. The radiolucent fatty component forms the outer ring of the lesion.

== Appearance ==
- Plain radiography: A well-circumscribed radiolucent lesion is visible within the affected bone, often with a central calcification or ossification. The appearance is likened to a target or cockade, with concentric layers.
- CT Imaging: The fatty nature of the lesion is readily identified as low attenuation (fat density) on CT. Central calcification appears as a high-density focus, accentuating the cockade appearance.
- MRI: The fatty component of the lesion demonstrates hyperintensity on T1-weighted images and suppresses on fat-saturated sequences. Central ossification or calcification may appear as a signal void. Surrounding sclerotic or reactive changes may be evident in advanced lesions.
- Bone Scintigraphy: Occasionally used for evaluation but typically shows minimal or no uptake, reflecting the benign nature of the lesion.
