= Mercedes-Benz sign =

Pattern seen in radiologic examinations

The Mercedes-Benz sign is a radiological sign seen due to the presence of gallstones. It is a triradiate shadow, characteristic of the Mercedes-Benz automobile trademark. The sign occurs due to the gas fissuring within the gallstone.
