= Pencil-in-cup sign =

Radiologic sign in psoriatic arthritis

The pencil-in-cup sign is a radiologic sign indicating a deformity where fingers have the appearance of a pencil lying in a cup. This sign is classically seen in psoriatic arthritis, but it is also reported in systemic sclerosis and rheumatoid arthritis.
