= Insular ribbon sign =

Radiologic sign in brain ischemia

The insular ribbon sign ("loss of the insular ribbon") is a radiologic sign observed on computed tomography of the brain following acute middle cerebral artery strokes. This sign describes the loss of definition between gray and white matter in the brain along the lateral margins of the insular cortex. Loss of the insular ribbon occurs when edema forms in the cerebral tissue of the ischemic area following cerebrovascular occlusion, obscuring the gray-white interface.
