= Deep sulcus sign =

Radiological sign indicating pneumothorax

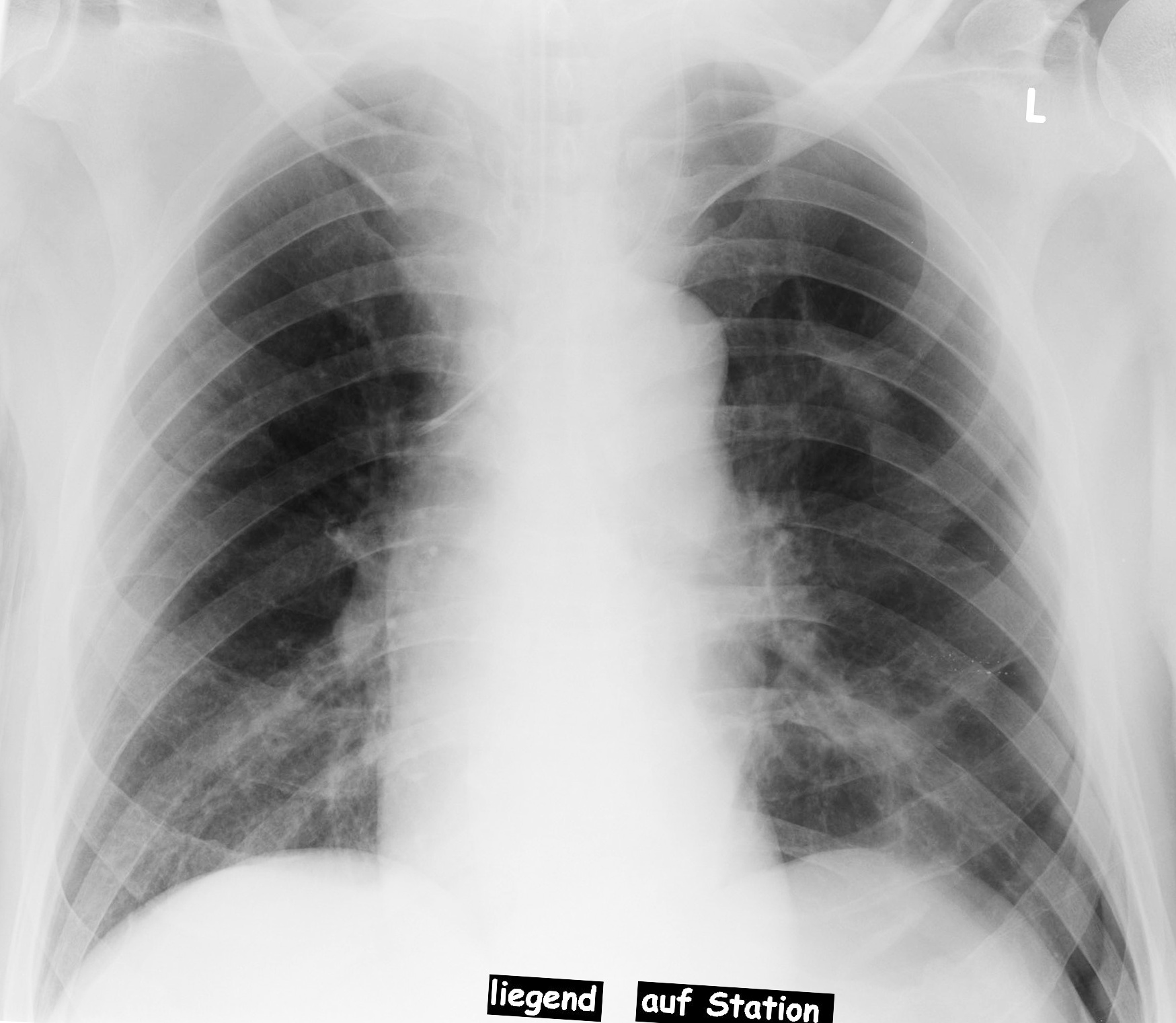
- Pneumothorax left sided
- Differential diagnosis: pneumothorax

In radiology, the deep sulcus sign on a supine chest radiograph is an indirect indicator of a pneumothorax. In a supine film, it appears as a deep, lucent, ipsilateral costophrenic angle within the nondependent portions of the pleural space as opposed to the apex (of the lung) when the patient is upright. The costophrenic angle is abnormally deepened when the pleural air collects laterally, producing the deep sulcus sign.

Patients with chronic obstructive pulmonary disease (COPD) may exhibit deepened lateral costophrenic angles due to hyperinflation of the lungs and cause a false deep sulcus sign.
