= Stepladder sign =

Radiologic sign in small bowel obstruction

The stepladder sign is a radiological finding observed in the context of small bowel obstruction on abdominal X-rays or computed tomography scans. It refers to the appearance of multiple, dilated small bowel loops arranged in a step-like configuration, typically visible in upright or lateral decubitus imaging positions. This sign is indicative of bowel obstruction and is used to identify and localize the site of obstruction, aiding in diagnosis and management.

== Pathophysiology ==
In small bowel obstruction, a mechanical or functional blockage prevents normal passage of intestinal contents leading to increased peristaltic effort in the dilated loops causing bowel loops proximal to the obstruction to dilate. Gas and fluid accumulates proximal to the obstruction.

== Imaging features ==
- Plain Radiography, upright or lateral decubitus views: Multiple air-fluid levels in dilated small bowel loops and step-like arrangement of loops descending toward the pelvis.
- Computed Tomography (CT): Clearly delineates dilated loops arranged in a stepwise pattern. CT can also be used to identify the transition point (site of obstruction) and underlying cause. Complications such as ischemia, strangulation, or perforation, if present, can also be identified in CT.
