= Light bulb sign =

Radiologic sign in posterior shoulder dislocation

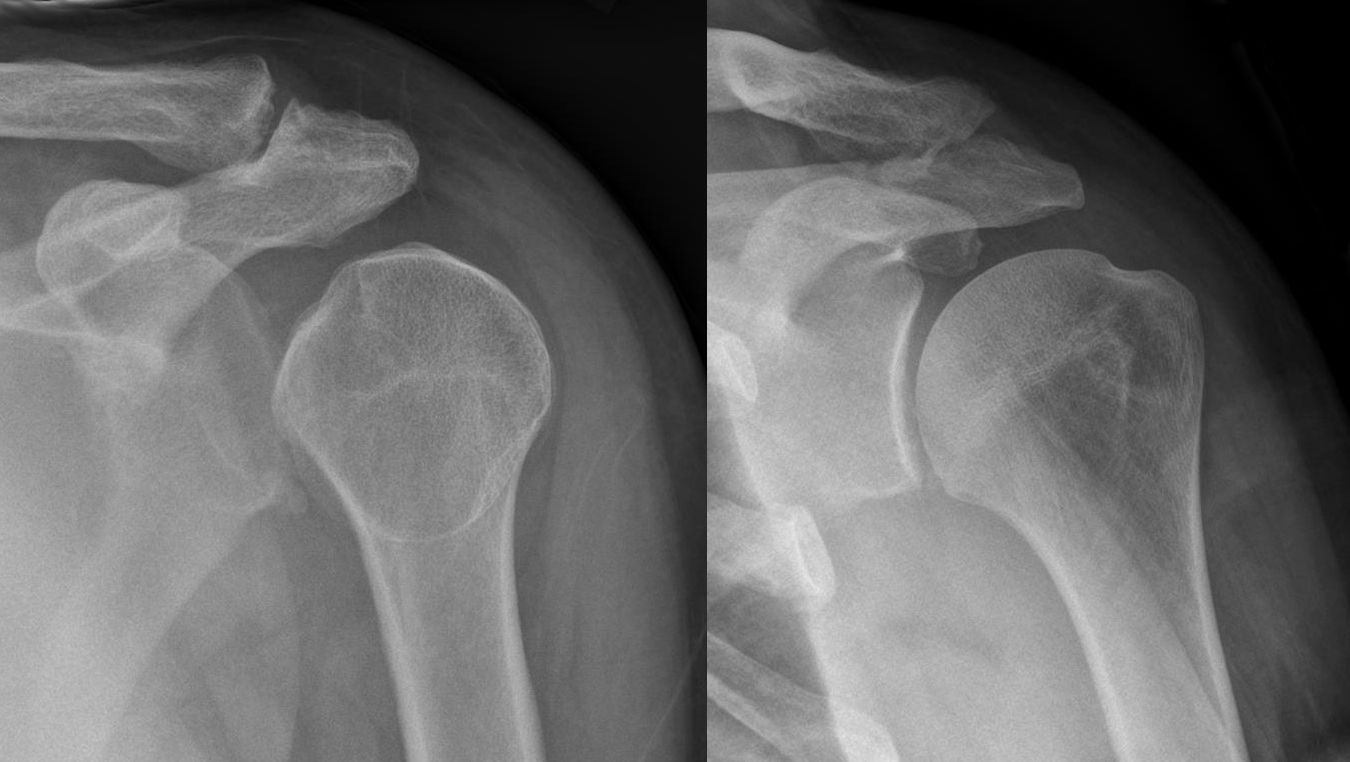
X-ray shoulder showing light bulb sign (left) in posterior shoulder dislocation. The image on the right was taken after reposition.

The light bulb sign is a radiological finding observed on plain radiographs in the context of posterior shoulder dislocation. It refers to the abnormal, rounded appearance of the humeral head, which resembles a "light bulb," due to internal rotation of the arm following dislocation.

== Pathophysiology ==
In posterior shoulder dislocation, the humeral head is displaced posteriorly out of the glenoid cavity. This injury is frequently associated with internal rotation where the humeral head rotates internally, altering its usual elliptical contour to a more rounded shape, creating the "light bulb" appearance. On anteroposterior (AP) radiographs, the humeral head no longer overlaps the glenoid, further emphasizing its abnormal shape.

== Causes ==
Posterior shoulder dislocations typically result from trauma such as seizures or electric shocks, which cause forceful contraction of the internal rotator muscles of the shoulder.

== Imaging features ==
=== Plain radiography ===
The light bulb sign is best observed on an AP radiograph of the shoulder. Key features include:

- Rounded humeral head: The humeral head appears symmetrically rounded, resembling a light bulb due to internal rotation.
- Loss of normal glenohumeral overlap: The humeral head is posteriorly displaced, disrupting the alignment with the glenoid cavity.
- Rim sign: Widening of the joint space (>6 mm) between the medial edge of the humeral head and the glenoid. This sign is not specific to posterior dislocation, and can occur also in hemarthrosis.
