= Reversed batwing sign =

Radiologic sign

The reversed batwing sign is a radiologic sign describing a pattern of lung opacities in which abnormalities are predominantly peripheral, with relative sparing of the perihilar (central) regions. This distribution is the inverse of the classic batwing or butterfly pattern seen in typical cardiogenic pulmonary edema.

The sign is most commonly identified on chest radiography and computed tomography (CT) and is descriptive rather than diagnostic.

== Clinical associations ==
Reversed batwing sign is commonly associated with chronic eosinophilic pneumonia and organizing pneumonia. Rare causes include alveolar sarcoidosis, lung contusions and lung infarcts.
