= Sandwich vertebra =

Pattern seen in radiologic examinations

Sandwich vertebral body is a radiologic sign where the endplates of the vertebra are sclerotic, giving it the appearance of a sandwich. This sign is seen in osteopetrosis, particularly in the autosomal dominant variety.
