= Jackstone calculus =

Type of urinary tract stone

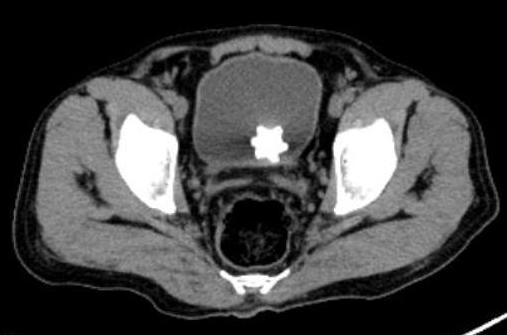
Large jackstone in the bladder of a 60-year-old man

Jackstone calculus is a type of urinary tract stone characterized by its unique appearance with stippled and spiculated contour, resembling a toy jack. Jackstone calculi are composed of calcium oxalate dihydrate, which gives them their irregular shape. They are often detected in radiological investigations or cystoscopy.
