= Dagger sign =

Pattern seen in radiologic examinations

Dagger sign is a radiologic sign seen in advanced cases of ankylosing spondylitis. The appearance of a dagger is seen in the X-ray because of ossification of the supraspinous and infraspinous ligaments. As a result, a central dense line of sclerosis, resembling a dagger can be seen in the AP radiograph of spine and pelvis.
