= Ice cream cone sign =

Normal CT appearance of the middle ear

The ice cream cone sign is the normal appearance of the malleus and incus on an axial high-resolution CT image of the temporal bone. The two ossicles meet at the incudomalleal joint in the epitympanum, and on the axial image the rounded head of the malleus sits against the body of the incus to give the outline of a scoop of ice cream resting on a cone: the malleus head is the scoop and the incus body is the cone. Prussak's space, the lateral recess of the epitympanum, lies between this ossicular complex and the scutum.

Recognising the normal configuration is useful because loss of the ice cream cone shape indicates disruption of the ossicular chain, such as incudomalleal dislocation after temporal bone trauma.
