= Golden S sign =

Pattern seen in radiologic examinations

- Differential diagnosis: lung mass, lung collapse

In radiology, the Golden S sign, also known as the S sign of Golden, is a radiologic sign seen on chest X-ray that suggests a central lung mass or a lung collapse. It was first described by, and subsequently named after, Dr Ross Golden (1889–1975) in 1925 in association with bronchial carcinoma, but it is also seen in metastatic cancer, enlarged lymph nodes, and collapse of the right upper lobe of the lung.

== Appearance ==
The Golden S sign can be seen on plain radiographs as well as on computed tomography (CT) scans of the chest. The sign is seen in the right lung as a distorted minor fissure, whose lateral aspect is concave inferiorly and whose medial aspect is convex inferiorly. This produces a "reverse S" appearance, responsible for the sign being occasionally called the reverse S sign of Golden.

Although typically seen with the collapse of the right upper lobe of the lung, it can sometimes also be seen with the collapse of other lobes.
