= Codfish vertebra =

Pattern seen in radiologic examinations

Codfish vertebra

Codfish vertebra refers to the biconcave appearance of the vertebra in sagittal radiographs due to pathological changes, such as demineralisation. Codfish appearance of the vertebra is seen in several conditions such as osteoporosis, osteomalacia, steroid or heparin therapy, Cushing syndrome, sickle cell disease, leukemia, Duchenne muscular dystrophy, and homo-cystinuria. Codfish vertebra sign is usually first seen in lumbar vertebrae.

The name of this condition refers to shape of the centrum, or main vertebral body, of the vertebrae in bony fishes. In contrast to mammals such as humans, fish vertebrae are typically concave at both the anterior and posterior faces (amphicoelous).
