= Comet tail sign (CT thorax) =

Radiologic sign for round atelectasis

The comet tail sign is a radiological finding seen in chest CT. It refers to a specific appearance resembling a comet's tail, characterised by a bright, streaky opacity due to the presence of a round atelectasis in chest CT.

== Description ==
In case of a round atelectatic mass, the nearby bronchovascular bundle appears to be pulled into the mass, resembling the tail of a comet. The comet tail usually extends from a central point in the lung periphery towards the hilum. If intravenous contrast is injected, homogenous enhancement is seen.
