= Wilkinson's syndrome =

Pattern seen in radiologic examinations

- Other names: Sclerotic pedicle sign
- Specialty: Radiology
- Usual onset: Congenital

Wilkinson's syndrome (also known as Sclerotic pedicle sign) is a radiographic term which describes a unilaterally enlarged pedicle opposite a contralateral pars defect. The enlarged pedicle may due to stress hypertrophy, and changes may extend into the adjacent lamina and transverse processes.

The characteristic radiographic feature of Wilkinson's syndrome is a missing pedicle with a thick, sclerotic contralateral pedicle at the same level. This is sometimes referred to as a "winking owl sign".
