= Pancake kidney =

Congenital anomaly of the kidney

Pancake kidney (also known as disc kidney, shield kidney, or doughnut kidney) is a rare anomaly of the kidney with complete fusion of the superior, mild and inferior poles of both kidneys. The kidney is seen as a single, disc-shaped mass typically located in the pelvis. Each kidney has its own ureter that does not cross the midline.

== Features ==
Pancake kidney is often associated with anomalies in other organs. Those with pancake kidneys are susceptible to urinary tract infections and renal stones due to anomalies in the collecting system of the kidneys and the short ureters.

== Diagnosis ==
Ultrasound may initially suggest the condition, but computed tomography or magnetic resonance imaging provides a definitive diagnosis.
