= Small bowel faeces sign =

Radiologic sign seen in small bowel obstruction

The small bowel feces sign is a radiological finding observed in radiological imaging studies, particularly in cases of small bowel obstruction. It is characterized by the presence of particulate matter resembling fecal material within the lumen of dilated small bowel loops. This sign is most commonly identified on computed tomography (CT) scans and, less frequently, on abdominal radiographs.

== Pathophysiology ==
The small bowel feces sign results from stagnation of enteric contents within dilated segments of the small intestine. When intestinal motility is impaired due to obstruction, progressive dehydration of luminal contents occurs, leading to the formation of solid particulate matter that mimics feces. This sign often indicates a chronic or subacute obstruction where bowel function is severely compromised.

The composition of the particulate matter includes partially digested food, desquamated epithelial cells and mucus, giving it the characteristic heterogeneous appearance resembling colonic feces. This radiological finding suggests that the obstruction has persisted long enough to allow for these changes to occur.

== Imaging characteristics ==
On CT imaging, the small bowel feces sign appears as a mottled, mixed-density pattern within a distended small bowel loop. It is typically located proximal to the site of obstruction and is often accompanied by other features of small bowel obstruction, such as:

- Dilated bowel loops: Loops proximal to the obstruction exhibit dilation (>2.5-3 cm in diameter).
- Transition zone: A point where the caliber of the bowel changes from dilated to collapsed, indicating the site of obstruction.
- Air-fluid levels: Seen in upright or decubitus imaging, reflecting stasis of luminal contents.

On plain radiographs, it may be difficult to discern this sign definitively due to its lower resolution and 2D view, compared to CT which has higher resolution and 3D orientation.
