= Wimberger's sign =

Clinical sign for congenital syphilis

The Wimberger's sign, also called Wimberger's corner sign, refers to localized bilateral metaphyseal destruction of the medial proximal tibia. It is a pathognomonic sign for congenital syphilis.
