= Drooping lily sign =

Radiologic sign in duplex kidney

The drooping lily sign is a radiological finding observed on imaging studies of the kidneys, most commonly associated with duplex collecting system and obstruction of the upper moiety. This sign is characterized by the appearance of a compressed, non-obstructed lower renal moiety, which takes on a "drooping" or displaced appearance due to the distension of the obstructed upper moiety.

== Pathophysiology ==
The drooping lily sign is typically seen in the context of a duplex collecting system, a congenital anomaly in which the kidney has two separate ureters draining from two distinct renal segments (upper and lower poles). When the ureter draining the upper moiety becomes obstructed, often by a ureterocele (a cystic dilation of the distal ureter within the bladder), the upper moiety becomes dilated while the lower moiety remains functional and compressed.

The "drooping" appearance arises due to the enlarged upper moiety compressing and displacing the lower moiety downward and laterally. The non-obstructed lower moiety maintains normal function but appears smaller and distorted on imaging.
