= Coca cola bottle sign =

Radiologic sign

The Coca-Cola bottle sign is a descriptive imaging sign in which an extraocular muscle appears fusiform (spindle-shaped) due to enlargement of the muscle belly with relative sparing of its tendinous insertion on computed tomography (CT) or magnetic resonance imaging (MRI). The sign is most commonly described in thyroid eye disease, also known as Graves ophthalmopathy, where multiple extraocular muscles may be enlarged while their tendons are relatively spared.

In thyroid eye disease, the inflammatory and remodeling process affecting orbital soft tissues commonly involves the extraocular muscles, producing enlargement that is often greatest in the muscle belly, with the anterior tendinous insertion relatively preserved in thickness and contour. This produces a tapered configuration on cross-sectional imaging that is likened to the contour of a classic Coca-Cola bottle, with narrow neck at the tendon with a wider body at the muscle belly.

The sign can be described on CT, typically as fusiform thickening of one or more extraocular muscles with tendon sparing. The muscle most commonly involved is the inferior rectus, followed by the medial, lateral and superior recti, respectively.
