= Cottage loaf sign =

Radiologic sign in diaphragmatic rupture

The cottage loaf sign is a radiological finding associated with diaphragmatic rupture, often observed on imaging studies such as computed tomography (CT) or Magnetic Resonance Imaging (MRI). This sign refers to the appearance of herniated liver into the thoracic cavity, with a characteristic "stacked" or "two-tiered" morphology resembling a traditional British cottage loaf—a smaller, rounded structure situated atop a larger one. It is a key indicator of diaphragmatic injury, typically resulting from blunt or penetrating trauma.
