= Galaxy sign =

Radiologic sign

The galaxy sign, also called the sarcoid galaxy sign, is a finding on computed tomography (CT) of the chest in which a large lung nodule is formed by the clustering of many small nodules (micronodules) around a larger central nodule. The small nodules are more densely packed at the centre and become more scattered toward the periphery, giving the lesion its resemblance to a galaxy of stars. It is reported in about a third of people with pulmonary sarcoidosis but is not specific to it, and the same appearance occurs in tuberculosis and some other diseases.

== Description ==
The lesion appears as a nodule with an irregular margin made up of numerous small nodules, predominating in the mid and upper lung zones. On radiologic and pathologic correlation the central mass corresponds to numerous coalescent granulomas, while the surrounding discrete small nodules represent granulomas that are less densely packed. In sarcoidosis these are noncaseating granulomas, and the large nodule reflects conglomerated granulomas and interstitial thickening rather than filling of the alveoli.

== Associated conditions ==
The sign was first reported in sarcoidosis and points toward that diagnosis, but it is not pathognomonic. It also occurs in active pulmonary tuberculosis, where it can closely mimic sarcoidosis. The galaxy sign has also been described in pulmonary mucosa-associated lymphoid tissue lymphoma.

In sarcoidosis the presence of the galaxy sign has been associated with younger age and a low CD4/CD8 ratio in bronchoalveolar lavage fluid, but not with disease severity.

== History ==
The galaxy sign was first described by Masaki Nakatsu and colleagues in 2002 in the American Journal of Roentgenology, who named it for the resemblance of the central mass with its scattered satellite nodules to a galaxy.
