= Empty sella sign =

Neuroradiologic sign

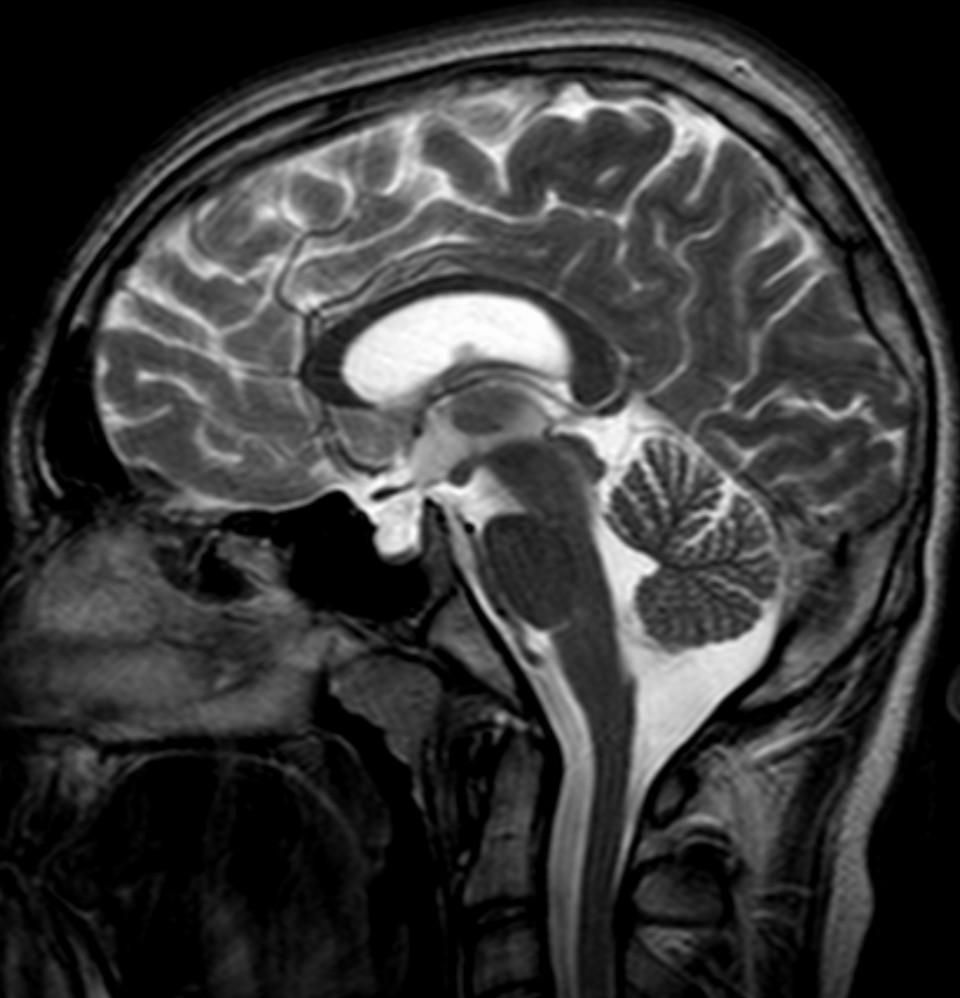
Empty sella in MR imaging

The empty sella sign is a radiological finding characterized by the partial or complete filling of the sella turcica with cerebrospinal fluid (CSF), causing the pituitary gland to appear flattened or compressed against the walls of the sella. This results in the sella appearing "empty" on imaging, despite the presence of the compressed pituitary gland. The empty sella sign is typically identified on magnetic resonance imaging (MRI) or computed tomography (CT) and can be associated with various clinical conditions or be an incidental findings.

== Pathophysiology ==
The empty sella sign occurs due to herniation of the subarachnoid space into the sella turcica, displacing the pituitary gland and allowing CSF to occupy the space. This phenomenon is often linked to the following mechanisms:

- Primary empty sella syndrome occurs without an underlying cause or pituitary pathology. It is associated with a defect in the diaphragma sellae, a small membrane that normally separates the pituitary gland from the subarachnoid space.
- Secondary empty sella syndrome occurs due to conditions affecting the pituitary gland, such as pituitary apoplexy (hemorrhage or infarction of the gland), surgical removal or radiation therapy targeting the pituitary, chronic intracranial hypertension.

In both primary and secondary cases, the pituitary gland is often compressed but retains some degree of function.

== Imaging characteristics ==
MRI is the gold standard for diagnosing the empty sella sign. Key features include:

- CSF signal: The sella turcica is filled with material that follows the signal characteristics of CSF on T1-weighted and T2-weighted images.
- Flattened pituitary gland: The pituitary gland appears thin and plastered against the sellar floor or walls.
- Enlarged sella: The sella turcica may appear expanded or normal in size.

On CT, the empty sella sign may appear as hypodensity in the sella, corresponding to CSF. There may be possible sellar floor thinning or remodeling due to chronic pressure changes.
