= Hot quadrate sign =

- Differential diagnosis: SVC syndrome (indirect)

A hot quadrate sign is an imaging appearance of increased enhancement in CT scans or MRI, or radiotracer accumulation in nuclear medicine, in which there is enhancement of the quadrate lobe of the liver. The appearance is an indirect reflection of the collateralized flow of SVC syndrome, in which occlusion of the superior vena cava leads to preferential flow to the quadrate.

The sign is similar in mechanism but distinct in significance from the hot caudate sign, in which the caudate lobe of the liver shows preferential enhancement or radiotracer accumulation with hepatic vein occlusion in Budd Chiari syndrome. In the latter, the caudate shows preferential flow because its direct drainage into the inferior vena cava remains unobstructed, as opposed to the remnant liver which drains into the hepatic vein.
