= Misty mesentery sign =

Radiological sign of the abdomen

The misty mesentery sign was described by Mindelzun et al in 1996 In the American Journal of Roentgenology and represents a non-specific radiological finding characterized by increased attenuation within the mesenteric fat on computed tomography (CT) imaging. It reflects pathological processes that result in infiltration, edema, or increased cellularity within the mesentery, often in association with inflammation and adjacent lymphadenopathy. The term "misty" is descriptive of the hazy appearance of the mesenteric fat, which typically has a lower attenuation on CT in healthy individuals.

== Pathophysiology ==
The misty mesentery sign results from abnormal accumulation of fluid, cells, or fibrotic material within the mesentery. The causes can be classified into inflammatory, neoplastic, or vascular categories. The attenuation changes are measured in Hounsfield Units (HU), with affected mesenteric fat demonstrating values higher than normal fatty tissue (typically less than -100 HU).

== Radiological features ==
The misty mesentery sign is typically identified on contrast-enhanced CT scans, particularly in the portal venous phase. Key imaging characteristics include hazy attenuation of mesenteric fat, with loss of the normal fat density and co-oexisting findings such as lymphadenopathy, ascites, or thickening of mesenteric vessels or bowel loops. The distribution of the mesenteric changes may help narrow the differential diagnosis.
