= Empty vertebral body sign =

Pattern seen in radiologic examinations

Empty vertebral body sign is a radiological sign used for diagnosing any injury with flexion-distraction mechanism of the vertebrae, particularly Chance fracture of the vertebrae. In Chance fracture, there is disruption and angulation superiorly or inferiorly of posterior elements of the vertebrae. As a result, the affected vertebral body is seen as radiolucent in the anterio-posterior view.
