= Double bronchial wall sign =

Radiologic sign in pneumomediastinum

The double bronchial wall sign is a radiological finding observed in cases of pneumomediastinum, a condition characterized by the presence of air within the mediastinum.

== Pathophysiology ==
Pneumomediastinum occurs due to the escape of air from ruptured alveoli or airways into the mediastinal space. The rupture of alveoli due to increased intrathoracic pressure (e.g., from coughing, vomiting, or trauma) leads to air tracking along the peribronchovascular interstitium which in turn accumulates in the mediastinum. As air accumulates, it dissects along the bronchial structures, creating a visible separation of the bronchial wall from the surrounding tissue. The result is the double bronchial wall appearance on imaging, a hallmark of pneumomediastinum.

== Imaging characteristics ==
The double bronchial wall sign is best visualized on CT, which provides high-resolution images of the mediastinal structures. The double bronchial wall sign is commonly seen in the central bronchi, particularly in the trachea or mainstem bronchi, where air is more likely to outline the structures. Associated findings such as air surrounding other mediastinal structures, such as the esophagus or great vessels may be present. Subcutaneous emphysema or air tracking into the neck may also be seen. This sign may also be diagnosed in X-ray images, although the sensitivity is much lower than that of CT.
