= Dense artery sign =

Pattern seen in radiologic examinations

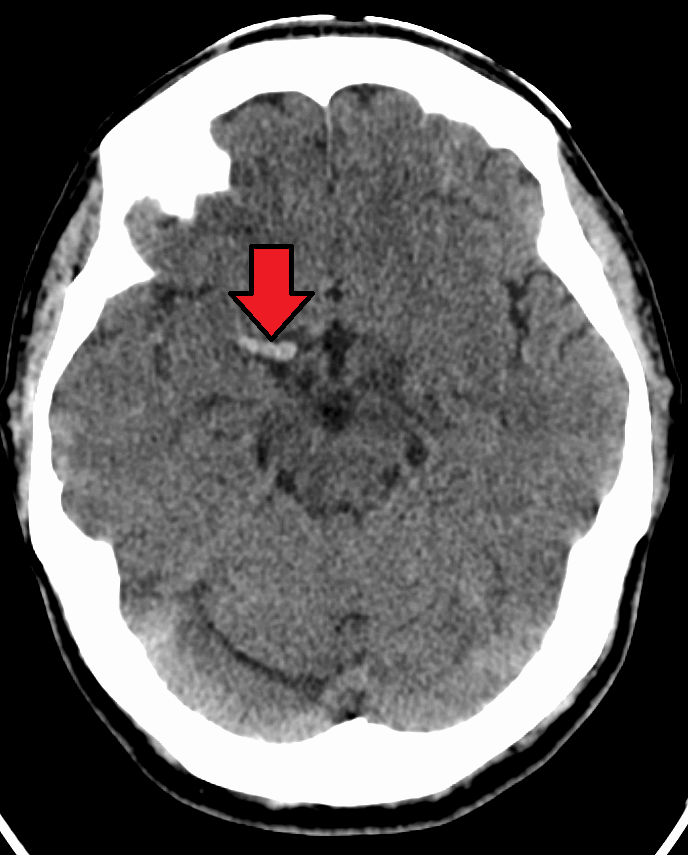
- CT scan without intravenous contrast showing hyperdense aspect of the right middle cerebral artery, indicating thrombus within the vessel
- Differential diagnosis: ischemic stroke

In medicine, the dense artery sign or hyperdense artery sign is an increased radiodensity of an artery as seen on computer tomography (CT) scans, and is a radiologic sign of early ischemic stroke. In earlier studies of medical imaging in patients with strokes, it was the earliest sign of ischemic stroke in a significant minority of cases. Its appearance portends a poor prognosis for the patient.

The sign has been observed in the middle cerebral artery (MCA), posterior cerebral artery (PCA), vertebral artery, and basilar artery; these have been called the dense MCA sign, dense PCA sign, dense vertebral artery sign, and dense basilar artery sign, respectively.

Rarely, a hypodense artery sign can occur due to fat embolism.

== Cause ==
Through cerebral angiography, the sign has been demonstrated to correspond to embolic or atherosclerotic occlusion of an artery. Specifically, the hyperdensity is thought to be due to calcification or hemorrhage associated with an atherosclerotic plaque.

== Identification ==
Identification of the dense artery sign is often based on subjective interpretation and false positives may occur. One study aiming to define criteria for the sign determined that measuring Hounsfield units on the CT scan could differentiate between the dense MCA sign associated with ischemic stroke and that caused by false positives. Specifically, the combination of greater than 43 Hounsfield units and an MCA density ratio of greater than 1.2 was diagnostic of a dense MCA sign associated with acute ischemic stroke.
