= Faceless kidney sign =

Radiologic sign of the kidney

The faceless kidney sign is a radiological finding observed on computed tomography imaging, typically in cases of duplex kidney anomalies or renal fusion abnormalities. It refers to the absence of the normal renal sinus structures, such as the renal pelvis and calyces, when viewed in cross-section. This sign is often used to identify conditions affecting the renal anatomy and function.

== Etiology ==
The faceless kidney sign is most commonly associated with renal fusion anomalies and developmental abnormalities that alter the orientation of the kidney’s collecting system. These include:

- Duplex kidney (Duplicated collecting system): A congenital condition where the kidney has two separate ureters (complete duplication) or a bifid ureter (partial duplication). In a coronal plane, both moieties may be visible, but in axial sections, one of the moieties may lack visible renal sinus structures, creating the faceless kidney sign.
- Horseshoe kidney : A condition in which the lower poles of both kidneys are fused. The fusion alters the normal position of the collecting system, which may cause the absence of the expected renal sinus appearance in axial images.
- Crossed fused renal ectopia: One kidney crosses over to the opposite side and fuses with the other kidney. The abnormal orientation may obscure the renal sinus, leading to the faceless kidney sign.
- Multicystic dysplastic kidney (MCDK): A nonfunctional kidney with multiple cysts and absence of normal renal parenchyma. The lack of normal renal sinus structures may mimic the faceless kidney appearance.
- Tumors and inflammatory conditions: Inflammation and tumor can distort the normal components of renal parenchyma, leading to faceless appearance.

== Imaging features ==
On axial CT, the affected kidney appears homogeneous, without the normal renal sinus fat, pelvis, or calyces. The absence of the central renal sinus structures gives it a "faceless" appearance.
