= Lung hernia =

- Specialty: Pulmonology

Lung hernia (Sibson hernia) is a protrusion of lung outside of thoracic wall. In 20% patients with lung hernia, the incidence is congenital. In 80% of the cases, the hernia is noted after chest trauma, thoracic surgery or certain pulmonary diseases. Congenital hernia occurs because of the weakness of the suprapleural membrane or neck muscles. In pulmonary diseases such as asthma, frequent coughing can lead to high intra thoracic pressure, causing the lung to herniate out. Lung hernia may occur near the neck (cervical), between the ribs (intercostal), near the vertebrae (paravertebral) or near the sternum (parasternal).

== Clinical manifestations ==
The patient presents with a protrusion near the neck or between the ribs. The mass becomes prominent when the patient is straining or coughing. In asymptomatic individuals, lung hernia is incidentally detected in a chest X-ray taken for another reason. On physical examination, a prominence or mass is seen during Valsalva maneuver.

== Treatment ==
Asymptomatic lung hernias may be managed by close observation. In symptomatic cases, immediate reduction and closure of the defect is indicated to prevent incarceration and strangulation.

Although lung hernias are rare and usually benign in nature, it is important for physicians to be aware that these entities do exist so that they are not alarmed when they are encountered. Knowledge of the benign nature of lung hernias will prevent the use of unnecessary invasive procedures and surgery.
