= Garland's triad =

- Differential diagnosis: Thoracic sarcoidosis

In radiology, Garland's triad (also known as the 1-2-3 sign) is the concurrence of reasonably symmetrical bilateral hilar lymphadenopathy and right paratracheal lymphadenopathy seen on a chest radiograph. These features are suggestive of thoracic sarcoidosis.
