= Juxtaphrenic peak sign =

Pattern seen during radiologic examination

Juxtaphrenic peak sign is a radiographic sign seen in lobar collapse or after lobectomy of the lung. This sign was first described by Katten and colleagues in 1980, and therefore, it is also called Katten's sign. The juxtaphrenic peak is most commonly caused due to the traction from the inferior accessory fissure. The prevalence of the juxtaphrenic peak sign increases gradually during the weeks after lobectomy of the lung.
