= Boomerang sign =

Neuroradiologic finding of splenial pathology

The boomerang sign is a radiological finding observed on magnetic resonance imaging (MRI) of the brain, particularly in diffusion-weighted imaging (DWI) sequences. It refers to a characteristic boomerang-shaped area of restricted diffusion in the splenium of the corpus callosum due to cytotoxic edema. This sign is associated with various neurological conditions and is considered a non-specific marker of splenial pathology, often reversible depending on the underlying cause.

== Anatomy and appearance ==
The splenium of the corpus callosum is the posterior part of the corpus callosum, a major white matter structure connecting the two cerebral hemispheres. On MRI, the boomerang sign appears as a boomerang-shaped hyperintense area on DWI. There is a corresponding low signal intensity on the apparent diffusion coefficient (ADC) map, indicating true restricted diffusion. The sign is often localized within the central or posterior splenium.
