= Omega sign =

MRI sign of precentral gyrus

The omega sign, also called the hand knob, is the appearance on axial magnetic resonance imaging of the brain of a knob-shaped part of the precentral gyrus that bulges backward into the central sulcus and resembles the Greek letter omega (Ω). The structure marks the motor area for the hand within the primary motor cortex, and it is used as a landmark to identify the precentral gyrus and the central sulcus on imaging.

On axial images the central sulcus has an S-shaped course with three bends, or genua: superior, middle and inferior. The middle genu is the deepest and is concave toward the front, and the knob of cortex lying in front of it produces the omega shape. The same knob looks like the letter epsilon (ε) in some people and like a hook on sagittal images. It corresponds to the "middle knee" of the central sulcus described by anatomists in the 19th century.

The omega sign is present in both cerebral hemispheres at roughly the same level, and the side opposite a lesion (the contralateral omega) can be used to work out where a lesion sits in relation to the central sulcus. The landmark was described by Tarek Yousry and colleagues in 1997 using functional magnetic resonance imaging, which showed that hand movement activated this part of the precentral gyrus.
