= Wimberger's ring sign =

- Differential diagnosis: scurvy

Wimberger's ring sign refers to a circular calcification surrounding the osteoporotic epiphyseal centers of ossification, which may result from bleeding. It is seen in cases of scurvy.
