= Napoleon hat sign =

Pattern seen during radiologic examination

The Napoleon hat sign (most commonly called "inverted Napoleon hat") is a radiologic sign observed on frontal radiographs of the spine at the level of the fifth lumbar vertebra (L5) and the sacrum (S1) that indicates the presence of severe spondylolisthesis and/or severe lumbar lordosis. When the L5 vertebra becomes severely displaced and overlaps the sacrum, the superimposed bones may appear as an inverted Napoleon hat (the L5 vertebral body represents the dome of the hat, and the transverse processes represent the brim).
