= Whirlpool sign =

Radiologic sign where bowel rotates around mesentery

The Whirlpool sign, also known as the Whirl sign, is related to mesentery when the bowel rotates around the mesentery causing a swirling appearance of the mesentery around the mesenteric vessels.

It can also be related to ovaries when twisting of the vascular pedicle of the ovaries takes place.
