= Chang sign =

Radiologic sign

Chang sign is a radiologic sign for detecting pulmonary embolism in X-ray films. It refers to the dilatation and abrupt change in calibre of a previously normal descending pulmonary artery on a chest X-ray film. Chang sign usually appears within 24 hours of the onset of chest pain due to pulmonary embolism, and the maximal dilatation of the descending pulmonary artery often occurs in two to three days after the onset of pain.

Chang sign is absent in case of co-existing pneumonia or other conditions causing central opacities, where the descending pulmonary artery cannot be visualised in the X-ray image.
