= Spalding's sign =

Indicator of fetal death

Spalding's sign is a sign used in obstetrics. It is named for Alfred Baker Spalding.

It is an indicator of fetal death. When fetal death has occurred loss of alignment and overriding of the bones of cranial vault occur due to shrinkage of cerebrum, abdominal sonar examination may reveal an overriding of the fetal cranial bones. Most estimates place the precise time of fetal death at about 4–7 days before overlapping and separation of the fetal skull bones appear.
