= Deep lateral femoral notch sign =

Indirect sign of a torn anterior cruciate ligament (ACL)

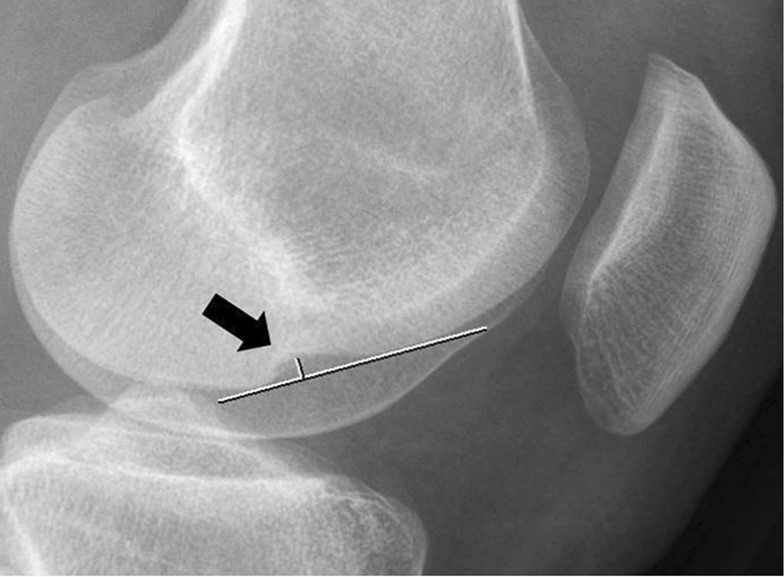
Deep lateral femoral notch sign

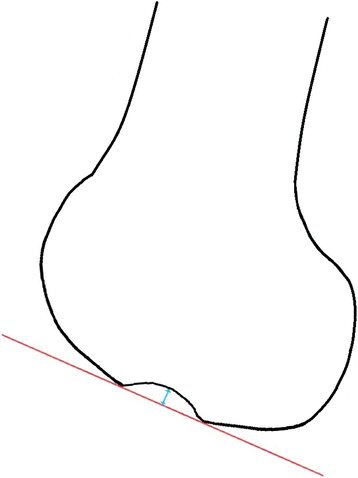
Measurement technique to determine the depth of the femoral notch on lateral x-rays

In radiology, the deep lateral femoral notch sign is a finding on a lateral radiograph that is considered an indirect sign of a torn anterior cruciate ligament (ACL). It is an abnormal deepening of the lateral condylopatellar sulcus from an osteochondral impaction fracture. A depth greater than 1.5 mm (0.059 in) is a reliable sign of a torn ACL.
