= Honda sign =

Radiologic sign for bilateral sacral fractures

The Honda sign (or H-pattern) is a radiologic sign seen in case of sacral insufficiency fracture in bilateral sacral insufficiency fractures on a radioisotope bone scan. It gets its name because the shape observed resembles the logo of the Honda motor company, resembling the alphabet "H".

== Description ==
This sign is typically associated with bilateral fractures of the superior and inferior pubic rami. In simpler terms, it indicates a specific pattern of pelvic fractures where both the upper and lower parts of the pubic bones are fractured on both sides.

While Honda sign is diagnostic of sacral insufficiency fracture, it is visible in only up to 40% of the cases.
