= White cerebellum sign =

Pattern seen in radiologic examinations

The white cerebellum sign, also known as reversal sign or dense cerebellum sign, is a radiological sign denoting the relatively white appearance of the cerebellum due to a generalized decrease in density of the supratentorial brain structures caused by extensive edema. The cerebellum is not truly more dense; it stands out because the surrounding cerebral tissue has lost density, so the appearance is a relative one. It is seen mainly in infants and young children.

== Causes ==
White cerebellum sign can be associated with raised intracranial pressure that occurs due to anoxic or ischemic changes in the brain. It can be found in:

- Birth asphyxia
- Status epilepticus
- Bacterial meningitis
- Encephalitis
- Severe head trauma
- Post-cardiac arrest hypoxia
- Drowning

== Pathophysiology ==
Diffuse brain edema is the likely cause of this radiological change observed in CT or MRI. On CT, the loss of density in the cerebral hemispheres erases the normal boundary between grey matter and white matter, leaving the cerebellum, brainstem and thalami looking comparatively dense.

== Prognosis ==
It was considered to indicate a bad prognosis. However, evidence suggests that it could be a non-specific indicator of diffuse brain edema which might not be as ominous as previously thought.

== External resources ==
Jha, Praveen. "White cerebellum sign | Radiology Reference Article | Radiopaedia.org". radiopaedia.org.
