= Mathe's sign =

Medical sign for perinephric abscess

Mathe's sign is an ultrasonographic sign that suggests the existence of an abscess in the proximity of a kidney. Normally during inspiration when standing, the kidneys move distally to some extent. When one of them does not move at all or moves downwards scarcely, either in erect position or deep inspiration, the test is called positive. Along with fever, urinary symptoms, and costovertebral angle tenderness, this will almost always indicate a perinephric abscess.
