= Cupola sign =

Pattern seen in radiologic examinations

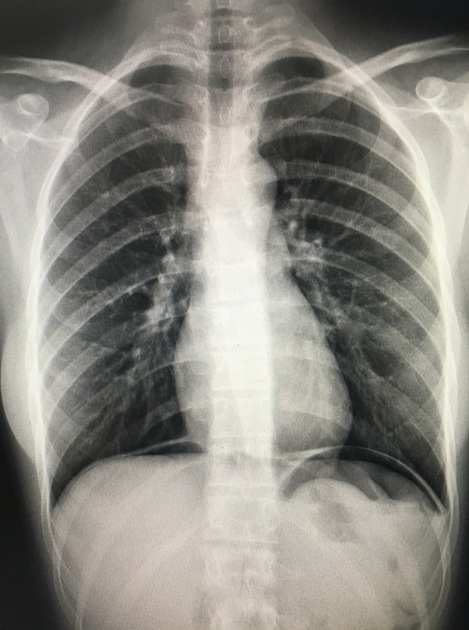
- Cupola sign
- Differential diagnosis: pneumoperitoneum

The cupola sign is seen on a supine chest or abdominal radiograph in the presence of pneumoperitoneum.

It refers to air that rises within the abdominal cavity of the supine patient to accumulate underneath the central tendon of the diaphragm in the midline. It is seen as lucency overlying the lower thoracic vertebral bodies. The superior border is well defined, but the inferior margin is not.

== Term ==
"Cupola" is an architectural term, referring to a small dome (in particular, a small dome crowning a roof or a turret). The word derives from a Latin word for a "little cup".
