= Popcorn calcification =

Manifestation of calcification in the body

Popcorn calcification or popcorn appearance is the radiological appearance of calcification with irregular rings and arcs, which resembles popcorns. The calcification patterns in chondroid lesions of the bone (such as enchondroma and chondrosarcoma), pulmonary hamartomas, degenerating fibroadenomas of the breast and calcified fibroids of the uterus have been described as 'popcorn calcification'.

In osteogenesis imperfecta, popcorn calcifications are often seen around the knees and ankles in radiological imaging, and are associated with irregularity in the growth plate of the bone.
