= Pyloric tit sign =

Radiologic sign seen in pyloric stenosis

The pyloric tit sign is a radiological finding observed during barium studies in cases of hypertrophic pyloric stenosis. It appears as an outpouching on the lesser curvature of the stomach, just proximal to the impression created by the hypertrophied pyloric muscle. This sign represents the transient entrapment of contrast medium between a peristaltic wave and the thickened pyloric muscle.
