= Onion skin periosteal reaction =

Medical condition of bone growth

Onion skin periosteal reaction also known as multilayered periosteal reaction or lamellated periosteal reaction refers to the multi layered concentric layers of new bone adjacent to the bone cortex. It is called onion skin periosteal reaction because it resembles the layers of an onion. These layers are formed due to any pathological process that leads to the variable, excessive growth of the bone. Onion skin periosteal reaction is seen in osteosarcoma, Ewing sarcoma and Langerhans cell histiocytosis. In radiological images, onion skin periosteal reaction is seen as radiolucent areas along the multiple layers of dense bone. The lucent areas may be occupied by tumors or inflammation.
