= Water bottle heart =

Radiologic sign seen in pericardial effusion

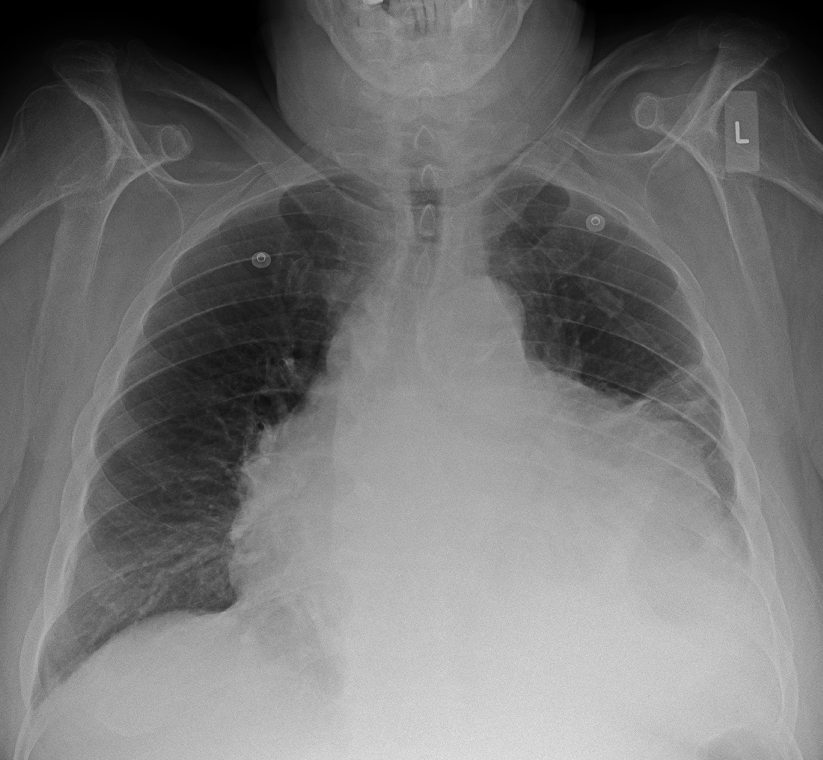
Massive pericardial effusion showing 'water bottle heart' sign

Water bottle heart is a descriptive term used in ‘Bijou’ radiology to describe the appearance of the cardiac silhouette on a chest X-ray when it resembles the shape of a water bottle. This sign is associated with pericardial effusion, a medical condition characterized by the accumulation of fluid in the pericardial cavity surrounding the heart.

On a chest X-ray, the normal heart silhouette should have a clear and defined outline. However, in cases of pericardial effusion, the accumulation of fluid within the pericardial sac causes the heart to appear enlarged and assumes a shape that is reminiscent of a water bottle, with relatively smooth cardiac contours. This distinct appearance is what gives rise to the term "Water Bottle Heart."

Although water bottle heart is most commonly associated with pericardial effusion, it can also be seen in severe dilatation of the heart secondary to valvular heart disease.
