= Osteopathia striata =

- Other names: Voorhoeve disease

Osteopathia striata is a rare entity characterized by fine linear striations about 2- to 3-mm-thick, visible by radiographic examination, in the metaphyses and diaphyses of long or flat bones. It is often asymptomatic, and discovered incidentally most of the time.

== See also ==
- List of radiographic findings associated with cutaneous conditions
