= Fat pad sign =

Elbow radiography finding indicating a fracture

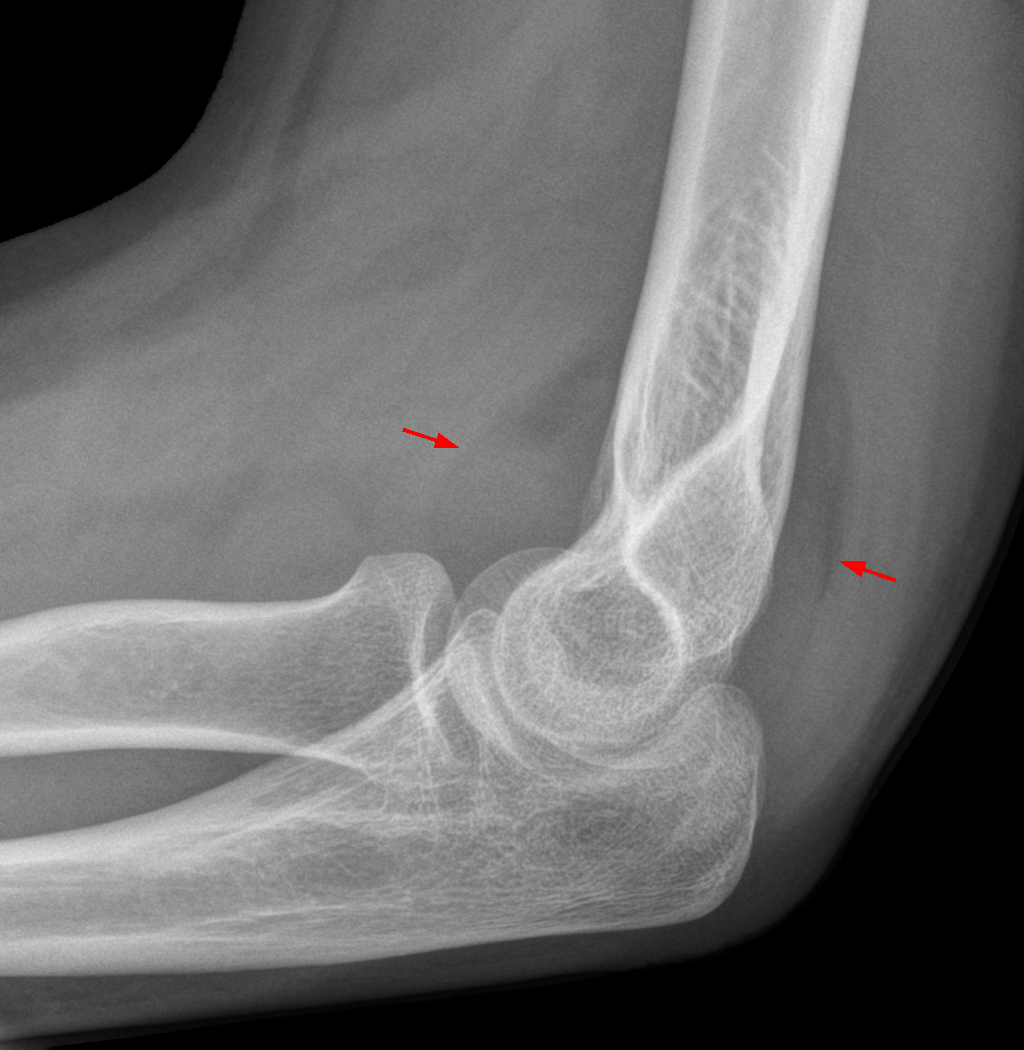
Fat pad sign: Ventral fat pad bowed and dorsal fat pad visible in a case of a nondisplaced fracture of the radius head which is not visible directly.

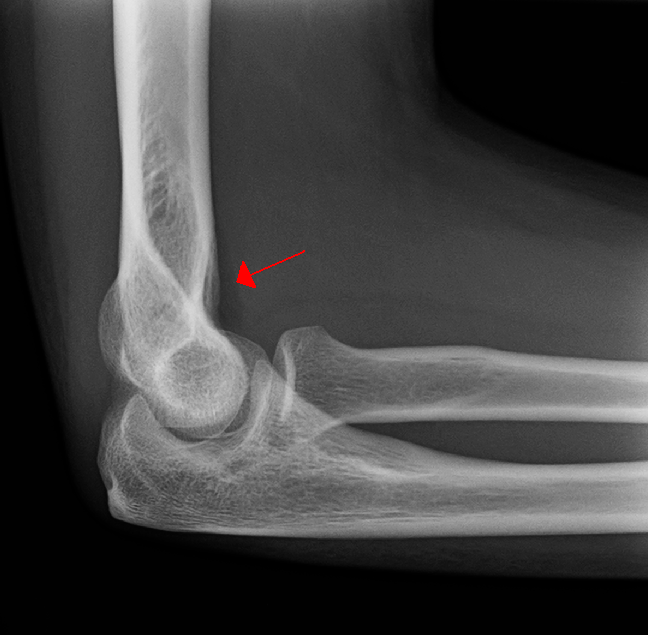
A normal anterior fat pad in a non-fractured arm.

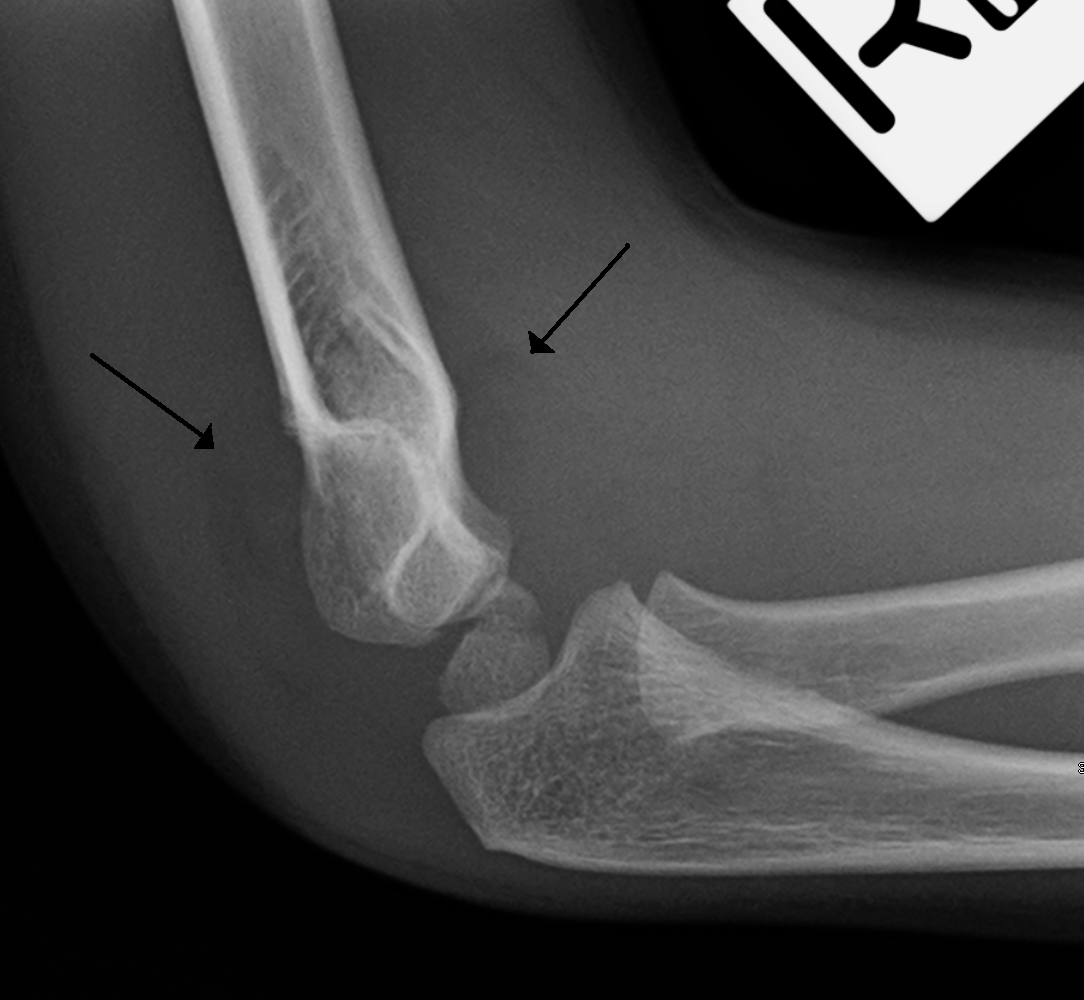
Anterior sail signs as well as posterior fat pad in a child with a supracondylar fracture.

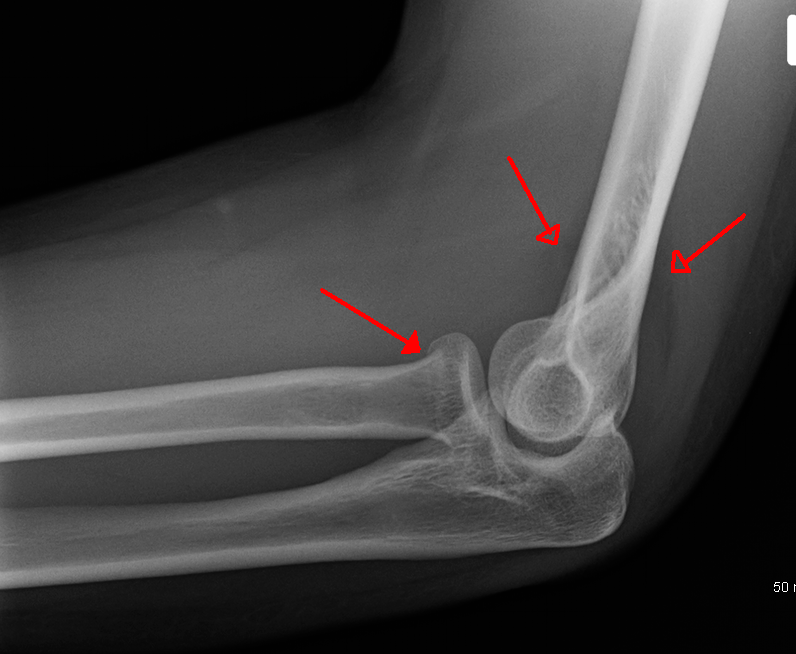
A subtle radial head fracture with associated positive sail sign

The fat pad sign, also known as the sail sign, is a potential finding on elbow radiography which suggests a fracture of one or more bones at the elbow. It may indicate an occult fracture that is not directly visible. Its name derives from the fact that it has the shape of a spinnaker (sail). It is caused by displacement of the fat pad around the elbow joint. Both anterior and posterior fat pad signs exist, and both can be found on the same X-ray.

In children, a posterior fat pad sign suggests a condylar fracture of the humerus. In adults it suggests a radial head fracture.

In addition to fracture, any process resulting in an elbow joint effusion may also demonstrate an abnormal fat pad sign. Increased intracapsular fluid is also seen in several conditions other than fracture and this produces the abnormal fat pad sign. (toxic synovitis, septic arthritis, Juvenile Rheumatoid Arthritis, osteomyelitis of the distal humeral physis and secondary septic joint). In these instances, history and clinical examination in addition laboratory results (WBC, ESR, CRP) will guide the provider in determining whether to treat the condition as an occult fracture or continue workup for other pathology.

The fat pad sign is invaluable in assessing for the presence of an intra-articular fracture of the elbow. An anterior fat pad is often normal. However a posterior fat pad seen on a lateral x-ray of the elbow is always abnormal. The patient will be unable to flex their elbow and requires orthopaedic input.

== Pathophysiology ==
The posterior fat pad is normally pressed in the olecranon fossa by the triceps tendon, and hence invisible on lateral radiograph of the elbow. When there is a fracture of the distal humerus, or other pathology involving the elbow joint, inflammation develops around the synovial membrane forcing the fat pad out of its normal physiologic resting place. This is visible as the "posterior fat pad sign" and is often the only visible marker of a fracture, particularly in the pediatrics population.
