= Preureteric vena cava =

Congenital disorder of urinary system

- Other names: Retrocaval ureter. Circumcaval ureter
- Specialty: Urology, obstetrics and gynaecology

Preureteric vena cava or retrocaval ureter is an uncommon congenital anomaly where the right ureter runs behind and medial to the inferior vena cava (IVC) due to dysgenesis of the IVC. This abnormality has been diagnosed using computed tomography urography (CTU), nuclear scintigraphy, ultrasound, intravenous urography, and magnetic resonance urography (MRU). When the illness manifests symptoms, surgery, either open or laparoscopic, is used to treat it.

== Signs and symptoms ==
The majority of patients who exhibit symptoms do so because of flank or abdominal pain, which is typically caused by ureteric obstruction and related hydronephrosis. This pain can be intermittent, dull, and aching. Hematuria and recurrent UTIs are possible presentations for some patients. Pyonephrosis and renal calculi could make the situation worse. A few cases are unintentionally discovered while doing radiographic imaging for other ailments.

== Treatment ==
There are two types of surgical management available for the retrocaval ureter: open and laparoscopic. These consist of ureteroureteral reanastomosis over a double-J stent along with or with no resection of the stenotic retrocaval segment, division of the dilated renal pelvis alongside transposition and reanastomosis, and ligation or transection of the IVC with or with no reanastomosis.

== Epidemiology ==
The prevalence is roughly 1 in 1500, with a 3:1 male-to-female ratio.

== See also ==
- Hydronephrosis
- Inferior vena cava syndrome
