= Vertebral hemangioma =

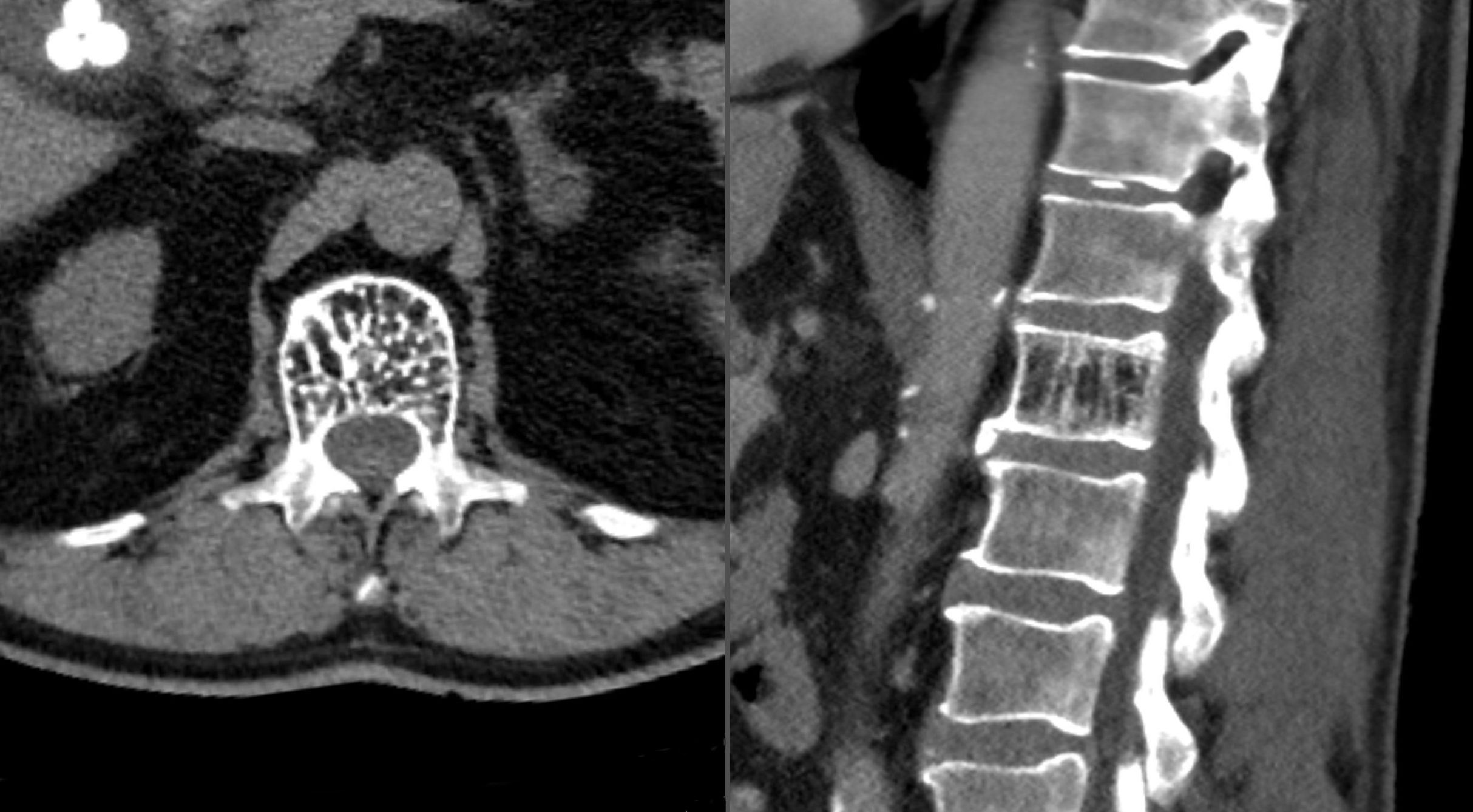
- Axial and sagittal CT views of a vertebral hemangioma
- Pronunciation: /ˌhiːmændʒiˈoʊmə/ HEE-man-jee-OH-mə
- Specialty: Neurology
- Symptoms: Predominantly asymptomatic. If symptoms arise these can include; unspecific back pain and neurological complaints (e.g. leg weakness, numbness). Symptoms are dependent on the location and growth of the VHs.
- Usual onset: Any age
- Diagnostic method: CT, MRI, or radiograph
- Treatment: Transarterial embolization, ethanol injection, radiotherapy, and/ or vertebroplasty.

Vertebral hemangiomas or haemangiomas (VHs) are a common vascular lesion found within the vertebral body of the thoracic and lumbar spine. These are predominantly benign lesions that are often found incidentally during radiology studies for other indications and can involve one or multiple vertebrae. Vertebral hemangiomas are a common etiology estimated to be found in 10-12% of humans at autopsy. They are benign in nature and frequently asymptomatic. Symptoms, if they do occur, are usually related to large hemangiomas, trauma, the hormonal and hemodynamic changes of pregnancy (causing intra-spinal bleeding), or osseous expansion and extra-osseous extension into surround soft tissues or epidural region of the spinal canal.

== Signs and symptoms ==
=== Clinical features ===
Vertebral hemangiomas are observed throughout any age, although most are diagnosed in people within their 50s alongside a higher presence in females with a 1:1.5 male-to-female ratio. They often present in the vertebral body of the thoracic and lumbar spine with potential to extend into the posterior arch. They can involve a single or multiple vertebrae.

Hemangiomas can display typically and atypically. Typical VHs have predominant fat overgrowth that present throughout various scanning techniques differently compared with atypical VHs that have less fat and more vascular content (see diagnosis).

Most hemangiomas present asymptomatically and only found incidentally through MRI, CT, or radiography. However, hemangiomas can become symptomatic in around 1% of cases.

In these rare cases, hemangiomas present active behavior and are known as aggressive or compressive VHs. When symptomatic, they can cause pain and myelopathy by intra-spinal bleeding, bony expansion or extra-osseous extension into surround soft tissue or the posterior neural elements. Highly vascular (cavernous type) hemangiomas can produce neurologic deficits without prominent evidence of spinal cord compression. The deficits in these cases are probably attributable to blood flow disturbances in the spinal cord.

== Cause ==
Vertebral hemangiomas are hamartomatous lesions, meaning that they arise from dysembryogenetic origin. They are formed from benign vasoformative neoplasms of endothelial cells that present as thin-walled vessels infiltrating the marrow, medullary cavity between bone trabeculae and are usually confined to the vertebral body. VHs are commonly seen incidentally while obtaining imaging for other indications.

The consideration of VHs as a neoplasm is disputed, due to limited aggressive histopathological features. As such, some authors refer to them as hamartomas or vascular malformations (see etymology below).

== Diagnosis ==
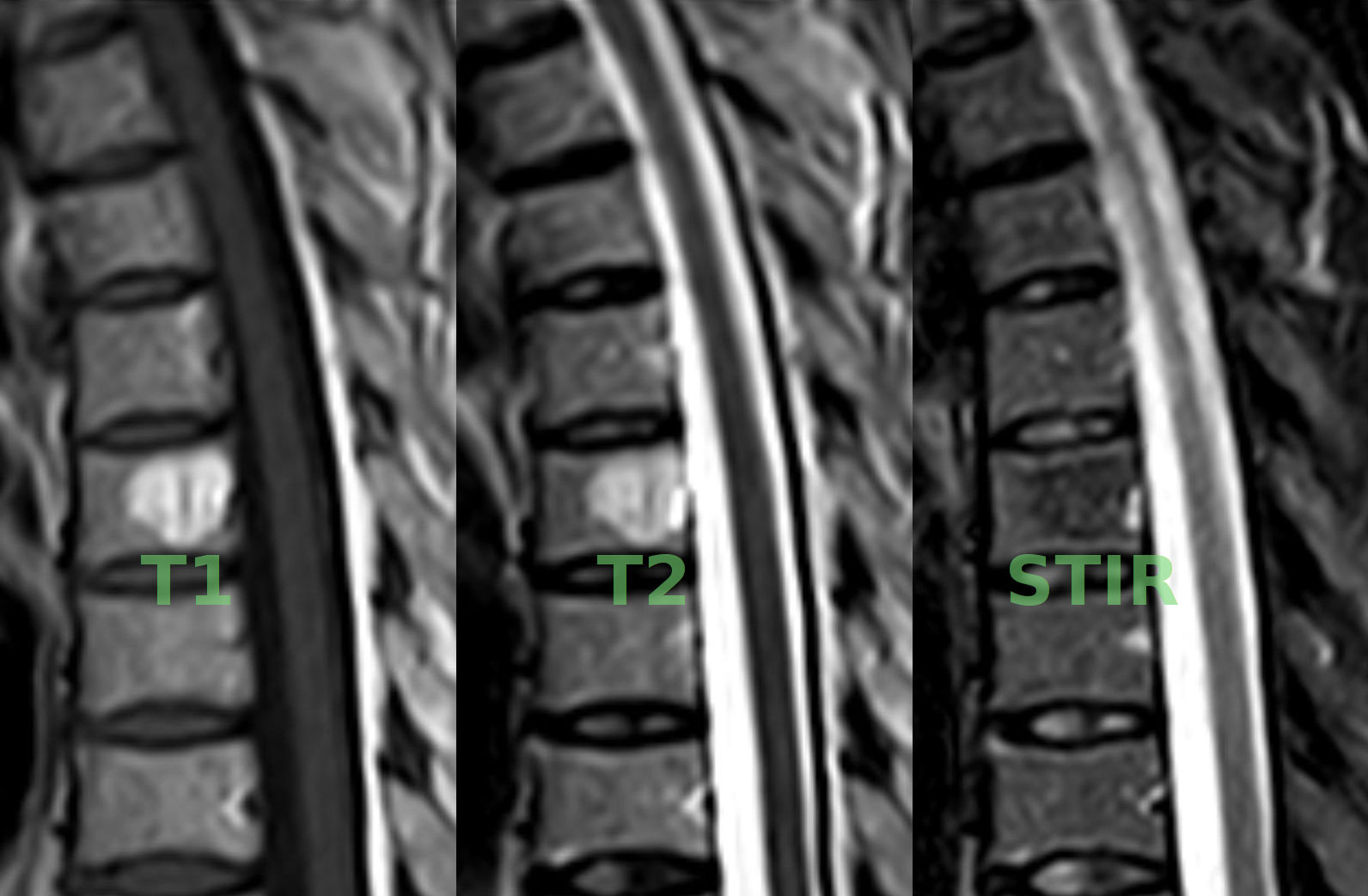
T1, T2, and STIR MRI images of a vertebral hemangioma

=== CT ===
On computed tomography (CT) or radiograph, VHs can cause rarefaction with vertical striations (often referred to as corduroy pattern) or a coarse honeycomb appearance. A polka-dot appearance on CT scan represents a cross-section of reinforced trabeculae. CT best defines the bony architecture and is the best diagnostic imaging method.

=== MRI ===
MRI appearance is dictated by histology of the tumor-like lesion—Vascularity, interstitial edema, and interspersed fat. The presence of high or moderate signal intensity on both T1 and T2 images is related to the ratio of fat to vessels and edema. For example, a VH with a high concentration of fat and a relatively low make-up of vessels and edema would show a high signal intensity on T1-weighted spin-echo images and intermediate signal intensity on T2-weighted fast spin echo images. Whereas a VH made-up of nearly equal portion of fat and vessels and edema would show intermediate signal intensity on T1-weighted images and high signal intensity on T2-weighted images.

=== Differential diagnosis ===
The differential diagnosis for lesions with similar radiologic appearance to VH includes but is not limited to hemangioblastoma, lymphangioma, bone metastasis, Ewing Sarcoma, and spinal dural arteriovenous fistula.

== Treatment ==
Treatment for VHs normally only takes place if a patient presents with neurological deficits or disabling pain. Otherwise, if found and do not present symptoms, VHs are just a clinical note and often not monitored further.

If symptomatic, VHs can be treated with surgery, transarterial embolization, direct ethanol injection, radiotherapy, and/ or vertebroplasty, each with varying degrees of success. The precise treatment plan is contested and often depends on the VHs' presentation in the patient. Each of these methods can be indicated in specific clinical settings.

== History ==
VHs were first described by Virchow in 1867 with Perman in 1929 noting their radiological appearance.

=== Etymology ===
The terminology of hemangiomas has faced recommendations by the International Society for the Study of Vasular Anomalies to rename the lesions' as "venous malformations" to present consistent language for practitioners and patients. However, the term "vertebral hemangioma" remains dominant throughout the literature.
