= Periampullary cancer =

Disease

- Ampulla of Vater
- Specialty: Oncology

Periampullary cancer is a cancer that forms near the ampulla of Vater, an enlargement of the ducts from the liver and pancreas where they join and enter the small intestine. It consists of:

1. ampullary tumour from ampulla of Vater
2. cancer of lower common bile duct
3. duodenal cancer adjacent to ampulla
4. carcinoma head of pancreas

It presents with painless jaundice which may have a waxing and waning nature, because at times the sloughing of the tumor tissue relieves the obstruction partially.

== Signs and symptoms of periampullary cancer ==
Signs and symptoms of periampullary cancer include:

- Jaundice (yellowing of skin, eyes and urine with pale stools)
- Itching
- Abdominal pain
- Weight loss and loss of appetite
- Recurrent vomiting
- Black stools
- Anemia

== Treatment ==
The treatment depends upon the stage of the disease and degree of jaundice. Surgery is the best possible option and can be considered if the cancer is diagnosed at a stage where it can be completely removed by surgery. If the jaundice is very high, the surgeon may choose to decrease jaundice before surgery by doing a procedure called endoscopic retrograde cholangiopancreatography (ERCP) and stenting. In this, a plastic or metallic tube (stent) is placed in the bile duct, which is blocked by the tumour, and opens it up from inside.

If the tumour is at an advanced stage, the surgeon may instead choose to first administer neoadjuvant treatment (chemotherapy or chemoradiotherapy) to decrease the size of the tumour and then to resect the tumour to increase chances of survival.

For unresectable tumours, an attempt may be made to downstage them so that they can be surgically removed. For this, neoadjuvant treatment is administered, after which some tumours will become operable.

== Surgery ==
The operation to surgically remove periampullary cancer is called Whipple operation or pancreaticoduodenectomy. In this, the head of the pancreas is removed along with duodenum, bile duct, gall bladder, part of the stomach, a small part of the small intestine and adjacent lymph nodes. To restore gastrointestinal continuity, the small intestine is then joined to the pancreas (sometimes pancreas is joined to the stomach), remaining bile duct and stomach.

== See also ==
- Pancreatic cancer
