= Radiologic sign =

Medical sign from radiology

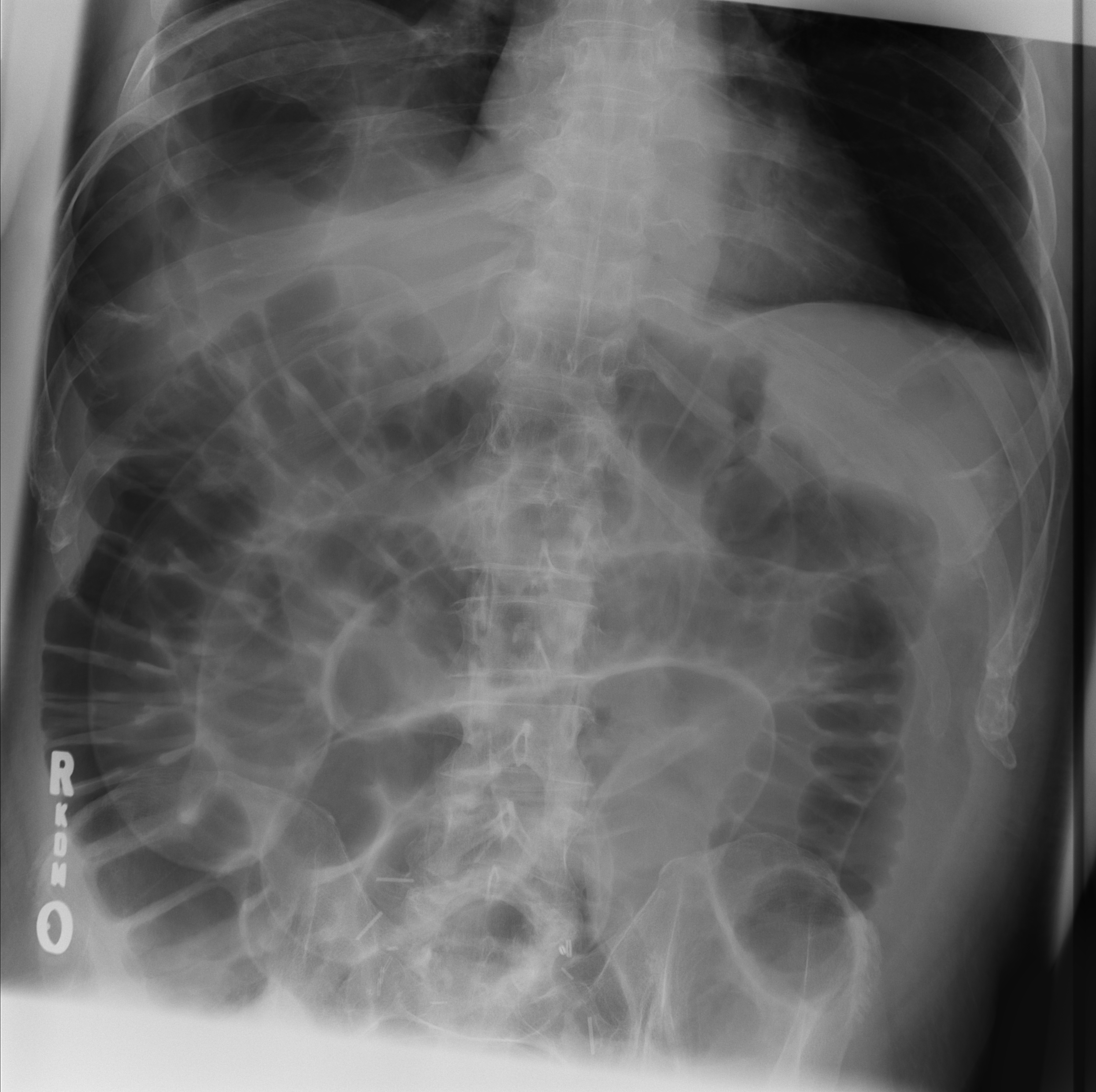
The dark areas on both sides of the intestines indicate that air is present in both sides. This is called "Rigler's sign".

A radiologic sign is an objective indication of some medical fact (that is, a medical sign) that is detected by a physician during radiologic examination with medical imaging (for example, via an X-ray, CT scan, MRI scan, or sonographic scan).

== Examples ==
- Double decidual sac sign
- Face of the giant panda sign
- Football sign
- Golden S sign
- Hampton's hump
- Hilum overlay sign
- Kerley lines
- Mickey Mouse sign
- Omental cake
- Peribronchial cuffing
- Pneumatosis intestinalis
- Rigler's sign
- Westermark sign

== See also ==
- List of radiologic signs
