= List of medical triads, tetrads, and pentads =

Triads of medical diseases

A medical triad is a group of three signs or symptoms, the result of injury to three organs, which characterise a specific medical condition. The appearance of all three signs conjoined together in another patient, points to that the patient has the same medical condition, or diagnosis. A medical tetrad is a group of four, while a pentad is a group of five.

== Triads ==
Name	Triad	Disease
Abdominal aortic aneurysm rupture triad	Hypotension, pulsatile abdominal mass, flank pain	Abdominal aortic aneurysm
Achalasia triad	Increased lower esophageal sphincter (LES) tone, decreased LES relaxation, aperistalsis	Achalasia
Allergic triad	Eczema (atopic dermatitis), allergic rhinitis, bronchitis	Atopy
Alkaptonuria triad	Ochronotic arthritis, ochronotic pigmentation, urine darkens on standing	Alkaptonuria
Amyand's triad	Amyand's hernia, appendicitis, undescended testis	
Anderson triad	Subcutaneous emphysema, rapid respirations, abdominal rigidity	Esophageal rupture (likely intra-abdominal)
Austrian syndrome triad	Pneumonia, endocarditis, meningitis (all caused by Streptococcus pneumoniae)	Austrian syndrome
Beck's triad	Muffled heart sound, distended neck veins, hypotension	Cardiac tamponade
Bezold-Jarisch reflex (BJR)	Apnea, bradycardia, and hypotension	Sinus bradycardia
Budd–Chiari syndrome	Abdominal pain, ascites, hepatomegaly	Budd–Chiari syndrome
Charcot's cholangitis triad	Right upper quadrant pain, fever, jaundice	Ascending cholangitis
Charcot's neurologic triad	Scanning speech, intention tremor, nystagmus	Multiple sclerosis
Triad of congenital toxoplasmosis	Chorioretinitis, hydrocephalus, intracranial calcifications	Congenital toxoplasmosis
Triad of congenital rubella	Cataracts, patent ductus arteriosus, sensorineural hearing loss	Congenital rubella
Congestive heart failure triad	Tachycardia, tachypnea, tender hepatomegaly	Congestive heart failure
Cushing's triad	Bradycardia, bradypnea, hypertension	Increased Intracranial Pressure
Dieulafoy's triad	Hyperesthesia of the skin, exquisite tenderness and guarding over McBurney's point	Acute appendicitis
Dietl's crisis	Renal colic, swelling in loin which disappears after urination	Hydronephrosis
Fanconi syndrome triad	Aminoaciduria, proteinuria, phosphaturia	Fanconi syndrome
Female athlete triad	Eating disorders, amenorrhoea, decreased bone mineral density	Relative energy deficiency in sport
Felty triad	Rheumatoid arthritis, neutropenia, splenomegaly	Rheumatoid arthritis complication
Goodpasture syndrome triad	Glomerulonephritis, pulmonary hemorrhage, presence of anti-GBM antibodies	Goodpasture syndrome
Gradenigos triad	Sixth cranial nerve palsy, persistent ear discharge, deep seated retro orbital pain	Gradenigo's syndrome
Graves Disease triad	Goiter, exophthalmos, pretibial myxedema	Graves' disease
Halban triad	Delay in a normal period followed by spotting, unilateral pelvic pain, and a small, tender, adnexal mass	Corpus luteum cyst
Triad of opioid overdose	Respiratory depression, pinpoint pupils, CNS depression	Opioid overdose
Triad of granulomatosis with polyangiitis	Focal necrotizing vasculitis, necrotizing granulomas in the lung and upper airway, necrotizing glomerulonephritis	Granulomatosis with polyangiitis
Hakim triad (Adams triad)	Urinary incontinence, gait disturbance, dementia	Normal pressure hydrocephalus
Quincke's Triad (Triad of Sandblom)	Melena, obstructive jaundice, biliary colic	Hemobilia
Triad of Meigs' syndrome	Ascites, pleural effusion, benign ovarian tumor	Meigs' syndrome
Hemolytic–uremic syndrome triad	Anemia, thrombocytopenia, kidney failure (but see pentad of TTP below)	Hemolytic–uremic syndrome
Horner's syndrome triad	Ptosis (eyelid), miosis, anhydrosis	Horner's syndrome
Hutchinson's triad	Hutchison's teeth, interstitial keratitis, nerve deafness	Congenital syphilis
Kartagener syndrome triad	Bronchiectasis, recurrent sinusitis, situs inversus	Kartagener syndrome
Leriche's syndrome triad	Bilateral hip, thigh, and buttock claudication, impotence, symmetric atrophy of the bilateral lower extremities due to chronic ischemia	Leriche's syndrome
Mackler's triad	Vomiting, pain, subcutaneous emphysema	Boerhaave syndrome
Three C's of measles	Cough, coryza, conjunctivitis	Measles
Meltzer's triad	Purpura, arthralgias, weakness/myalgias	Cryoglobulinemia
Triad of reactive arthritis	Urethritis, conjunctivitis and anterior uveitis, arthritis	Reactive arthritis
Saint's triad	Gallstones, diverticulosis, hiatus hernia	
Samter's triad (also known as acetylsalicylic acid triad, Widal's triad, Francis' triad or aspirin triad)	Aspirin sensitivity, nasal polyps, asthma	Aspirin-exacerbated respiratory disease
Tetany in children triad	Stridor, carpopedal spasm, convulsions	Tetany
Trauma triad of death	Coagulopathy, hypothermia, acidosis	Death
Triad of albinism	Black locks, oculocutaneous albinism, sensorineural deafness	Albinism
Triad of Alport syndrome	Sensorineural deafness, progressive kidney failure, ocular anomalies	Alport syndrome
Triad of Behcet's syndrome	Recurrent oral ulcers, genital ulcers, iridocyclitis	Behçet's disease
Triad of causes of biotin deficiency	Glossitis, alopecia, dermatitis	Biotin deficiency
Triad of Henoch–Schönlein purpura	Palpable purpura on buttock/legs, arthralgias, abdominal pain	IgA vasculitis
Triad of Hypernephroma	Pain, hematuria, renal mass	Hypernephroma
Triad of Kwashiorkor	Growth retardation, mental changes, edema	Kwashiorkor
Triad of Plummer–Vinson syndrome	Iron deficiency anemia, dysphagia, esophageal webs	Plummer–Vinson syndrome
Triad of Renal cell carcinoma	Hematuria, palpable abdominal mass, flank pain	Renal cell carcinoma
Triple test	Estimation of hCG, estriol, AFP	Fetal chromosomal abnormalities
Trotter's triad	Conductive deafness, immobility of homolateral soft palate, trigeminal neuralgia	Nasopharyngeal carcinoma
Unhappy triad (Also known as O'Donoghue's triad or a blown knee)	Injury to the ACL, MCL, and meniscus (either medial or lateral)	Knee injury
Virchow's triad	Stasis, hypercoagulability, vessel injury	Venous thrombosis
Triad of Wernicke encephalopathy	Confusion, ophthalmoplegia, ataxia	Wernicke encephalopathy
Whipple's triad	Hypoglycaemia during attacks, resolution of symptoms upon correction of blood glucose, symptoms brought about by low glucose states.	Insulinoma
Triad of aortic stenosis	Chest pain, heart failure, syncope	Aortic stenosis
Murphy's triad	Pain, vomiting, fever	Acute appendicitis
Tillaux's triad	Soft fluctuant swelling in umbilical region, swelling moves perpendicular to mesentery, zone of resonance all around swelling	Mesenteric cyst
Rigler's triad	Small bowel obstruction, a gallstone outside the gallbladder, air in the bile ducts	Gallstone ileus
Wilkie's syndrome (SMA syndrome)	Chronic peptic ulcer, chronic appendicitis, chronic calcular cholecystitis	gastro-vascular disorder

== Tetrads ==
Name	Tetrad	Disease
Tetralogy of Fallot	Pulmonary stenosis, ventricular septal defect, right ventricular hypertrophy, overriding aorta	Tetralogy of Fallot
Ménière's disease	Vertigo, tinnitus, fluctuating low frequency hearing loss, aural fullness	Ménière's disease
Zoonotic tetrad	Scrub typhus, chiggers, rodents and birds, scrub vegetation	

== Pentads ==
Name	Pentad	Disease
Pentad of TTP	Remembered by the mnemonic "FAT RN" (or alternatively "ART FaN"): fever, anemia (microangiopathic hemolytic anemia), thrombocytopenia, renal failure, neurologic disturbances	Thrombotic thrombocytopenic purpura
Pentalogy of Cantrell	Omphalocele, anterior diaphragmatic hernia, sternal cleft, ectopia cordis, intracardiac defect	Thoracoabdominal syndrome
Pentalogy of Fallot	Fallot's tetralogy with a patent foramen ovale or atrial septum defect	
Pentad of primary hyperparathyroidism	Stones (kidney stones), bones (bone-related complications), thrones (polyuria), abdominal groans (gastro-intestinal symptoms), psychiatric overtones (psychiatric and neurological symptoms)	Primary hyperparathyroidism
Reynold's pentad	Right upper quadrant abdominal pain, fever, jaundice, shock, depression of central nervous system function	Acute suppurative cholangitis

== See also ==
- Medical eponyms
- Pathognomonic
- List of eponymously named medical signs
