= Budd–Chiari syndrome =

Blockage of the hepatic veins that drain the liver

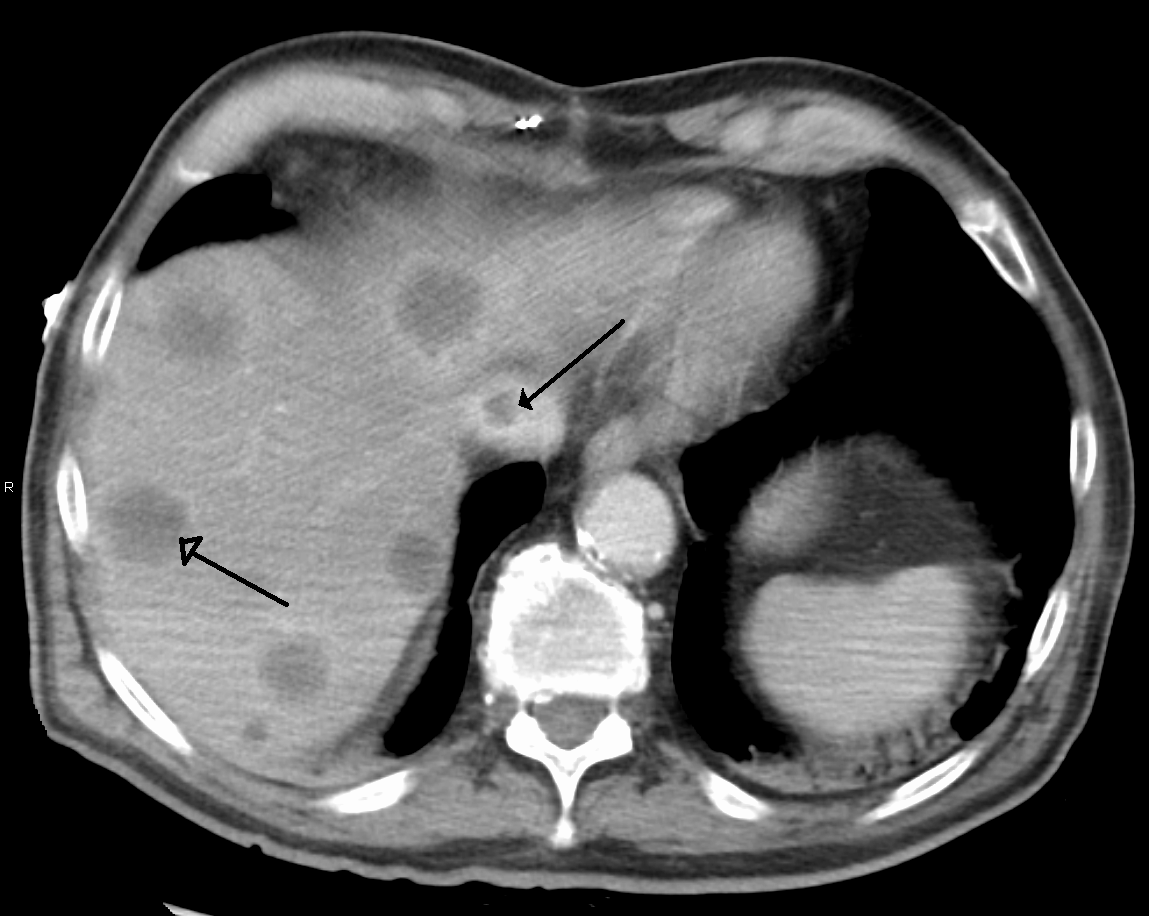
- Budd–Chiari syndrome secondary to cancer; note clot in the inferior vena cava and the metastasis in the liver
- Specialty: Hepatology
- Complications: Liver failure
- Treatment: Anticoagulant medication, Transjugular intrahepatic portosystemic shunt, Liver transplantation
- Frequency: 0.005%
- Named after: George Budd; Hans Chiari

Budd–Chiari syndrome is a condition when an occlusion or obstruction in the hepatic veins prevent normal outflow of blood from the liver.

The symptoms are non-specific and vary widely, but it may present with the classical triad of abdominal pain, ascites, and liver enlargement. Untreated Budd-Chiari syndrome can result in liver failure.

It is usually seen in younger adults, with the median age at diagnosis between 35 and 40 years, and it has a similar incidence in males and females. It is a very rare condition, affecting one in a million adults. The syndrome can be fulminant, acute, chronic, or asymptomatic. Subacute presentation is the most common form.

Patients with hypercoagulable disorders, polycythemia vera, and hepatocellular carcinoma are at a higher risk of having Budd-Chiari syndrome.

== Signs and symptoms ==
The acute syndrome presents with rapidly progressive and severe upper abdominal pain, yellow discoloration of the skin and whites of the eyes, liver enlargement, spleen enlargement, fluid accumulation within the peritoneal cavity, elevated liver enzymes, and eventually encephalopathy. The fulminant syndrome presents early with encephalopathy and ascites. Liver cell death and severe lactic acidosis may be present as well. Caudate lobe enlargement is often present. The majority of patients have a slower-onset form of Budd–Chiari syndrome. This can be painless. A system of venous collaterals may form around the occlusion which may be seen on imaging as a "spider's web". Patients may progress to cirrhosis and show signs of liver failure.

== Causes ==
The cause of Budd–Chiari syndrome can be found in more than 80% of patients with the condition. However, in 20% of cases, there is no underlying cause discovered. These cases are known as idiopathic Budd–Chiari syndrome. In about 75% of cases, there is an underlying hypercoagulability disorder, with a third of these people having two or more hypercoagulable disorders.

Primary Budd–Chiari syndrome occurs due to thrombosis of the hepatic vein. The most common cause is due to acquired hypercoagulability associated with myeloproliferative disorders (accounting for 40–50% of cases). Other acquired hypercoagulable disorders that may result in Budd–Chiari syndrome include antiphospholipid syndrome and paroxysmal nocturnal hemoglobinuria, which are responsible for 10–12% and 7–12% of Budd–Chiari syndrome cases, respectively. Inherited disorders of hypercoagulability may lead to thrombosis of the hepatic vein and Budd–Chiari syndrome. Factor V Leiden is responsible for 8% of cases. Other less common inherited disorders leading to the condition include factor II mutation (3%), protein C deficiency (5%), protein S deficiency (4%), and antithrombin III deficiency(1%). Budd–Chiari syndrome may be the presenting sign of these hypercoagulable disorders.

Secondary Budd–Chiari syndrome, which is very rare compared to the primary variant, is due to compression of the hepatic vein by an outside structure (such as a tumor or polycystic kidney disease).

Budd–Chiari syndrome is also seen in tuberculosis, congenital venous webs, and occasionally in inferior vena caval stenosis.

An important non-genetic risk factor is the use of estrogen-containing forms of hormonal contraception, which is implicated in 22% of cases of Budd–Chiari syndrome. Other less common risk factors include systemic diseases such as aspergillosis, Behçet's disease, connective tissue disease, mastocytosis, inflammatory bowel disease, HIV infection, sarcoidosis or myeloma. Medications such as dacarbazine, pregnancy, trauma or recent abdominal surgery are other causes.

People who have paroxysmal nocturnal hemoglobinuria (PNH) appear to be especially at risk for Budd–Chiari syndrome, more than other forms of thrombophilia: up to 39% develop venous thromboses, and 12% may acquire Budd–Chiari.

== Pathophysiology ==
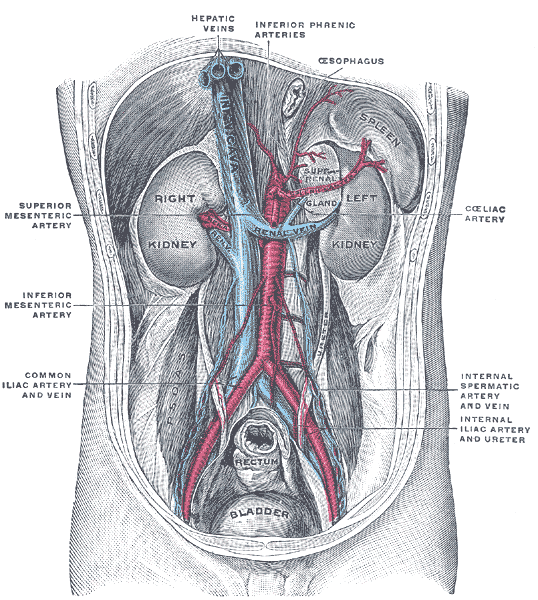
Posterior abdominal wall, after removal of the peritoneum, showing kidneys, suprarenal capsules, and great vessels. (Hepatic veins labeled at center top.)

Any obstruction of the venous vasculature of the liver is referred to as Budd–Chiari syndrome, from the venules to the right atrium. This leads to increased portal vein and hepatic sinusoid pressures as the blood flow stagnates. The increased portal pressure causes increased filtration of vascular fluid with the formation of ascites in the abdomen and collateral venous flow through alternative veins leading to esophageal, gastric, and rectal varices. Obstruction also causes centrilobular necrosis and peripheral lobule fatty change due to ischemia. If this condition persists chronically, what is known as nutmeg liver will develop. Kidney failure may occur, perhaps due to the body sensing an "underfill" state and subsequent activation of the renin-angiotensin pathways and excess sodium retention.

== Diagnosis ==
Budd-Chiari syndrome may present with elevated liver enzymes; alanine aminotransferase (ALT) and aspartate aminotransferase (AST) are often elevated in the acute phase and then decrease over time as chronic liver disease develops. Liver dysfunction can be indirectly measured with labs such as an elevated INR, decreased albumin level, and an elevated bilirubin level.

== Treatment ==
Identifying and treating the secondary cause of the hypercoagulability, or the primary hypercoagulable disorder leading to the Budd–Chiari syndrome is essential. With regards to secondary causes of hypercoagulability, 40–50% of cases of Budd–Chiari syndrome are due to myeloproliferative disorders, and these conditions each have their own specific treatments. A beta-blocker is indicated for prophylaxis against esophageal variceal bleeding, and as needed diuretics can be used in cases of fluid overload in people with ascites. Anti-coagulation is required for all patients with Budd–Chiari syndrome, even if a cause of hypercoagulability is not found. Warfarin is the preferred, and best studied anticoagulant, but direct factor Xa inhibitors may also be used.

Many patients will require further intervention. Some forms of Budd–Chiari may be treated with surgical shunts (such as portacaval shunt) to divert blood flow around the obstruction or the liver itself. Shunts must be placed early after diagnosis for the best results. TIPS (transjugular intrahepatic portosystemic shunt) has replaced shunt surgery as it is less invasive and overcomes intrahepatic outflow obstruction by diverting hepatic and portal blood flow to the inferior vena cava. TIPS accomplishes the same goal as a surgical shunt but has a lower procedure-related mortality, a factor that has led to a growth in its popularity. It is very effective in treating ascites and preventing further variceal bleeding. The TIPS procedure has been shown to have good outcomes, with a 78% five-year transplant-free survival rate. If all the hepatic veins are blocked, the portal vein can be approached via the intrahepatic part of the inferior vena cava, a procedure called DIPS (direct intrahepatic portocaval shunt).

Segmental occlusions of the inferior vena cava or portal vein can be treated with percutaneous transluminal angioplasty in which a balloon is passed via a guidewire to the site of the venous obstruction and then inflated to open the blockage, this may be followed by stent placement (either immediate stent placement or deferred (when the stent is placed later, if needed)).

Liver transplantation is an effective treatment for Budd–Chiari. It is generally reserved for patients with fulminant liver failure, failure of shunts, or progression of cirrhosis that reduces the life expectancy to one year. Survival rates in Budd–Chiari syndrome after liver transplantation are 76%, 71%, and 68% after 1, 5, and 10 years, respectively. It is recommended to continue anticoagulant treatment after liver transplantation, especially if the secondary or primary cause of hypercoagulability is still present, and to monitor for blood clots after liver transplantation.

Pregnancy is not contraindicated in those with Budd-Chiari syndrome, and if it occurs, anticoagulants should be continued with low molecular weight heparin as the preferred agent, as warfarin is teratogenic (associated with birth defects). Budd Chiari syndrome in pregnancy is associated with an increased risk of miscarriage and prematurity. Screening for esophageal varices is recommended in the second trimester, especially in those not on beta blocker prophylaxis. Screening for portopulmonary hypertension is also recommended for all pregnant patients with Budd-Chiari syndrome.

== Prognosis ==
Several studies have attempted to predict the survival of patients with Budd–Chiari syndrome. In general, nearly two-thirds of patients with Budd–Chiari are alive at 10 years. Important negative prognostic indicators include ascites, encephalopathy, elevated Child–Pugh scores, elevated prothrombin time, and altered serum levels of various substances (sodium, creatinine, albumin, and bilirubin). Survival is also highly dependent on the underlying cause of the Budd–Chiari syndrome. For example, a patient with an underlying myeloproliferative disorder may progress to acute leukemia, independently of Budd–Chiari syndrome.

== Eponym ==
It is named after George Budd, a British physician, and Hans Chiari, an Austrian pathologist.
