= Rigler's triad =

Findings in an abdominal radiograph

Rigler's Triad
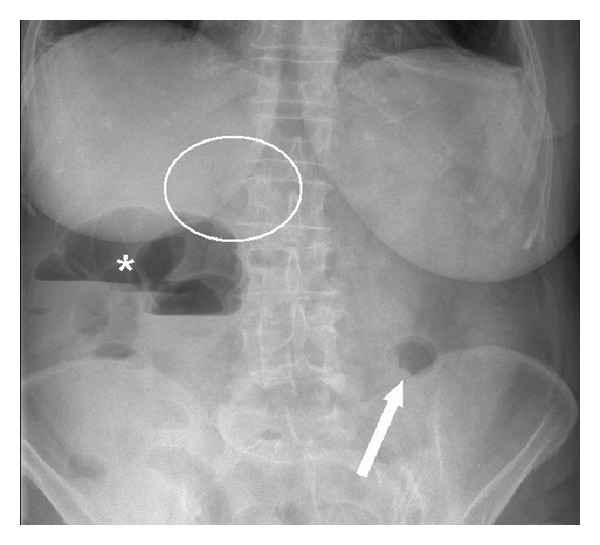
- Plain abdominal radiograph showing Rigler's triad (pneumobilia indicated by the circle, ectopic gallstone indicated by the arrow, and bowel distension indicated by the asterisk).
- Differential diagnosis: gallstone ileus

Rigler's triad is a combination of findings on an abdominal radiograph of people with gallstone ileus, a condition where a large gallstone causes bowel obstruction. Rigler's triad consists of: (1) small bowel obstruction, (2) a gallstone outside the gallbladder, and (3) air in the bile ducts. It bears the name of Leo George Rigler (1896–1979), who described it in 1941. It is not the same as Rigler's sign.

It is most commonly seen in 6th to 7th decade of life and affects females more often. Most patients with gallstone ileus are asymptomatic. Due to the fistula formation between the small intestine and gallbladder, large stones can lodge in the small bowel, leading to its obstruction. Pneumobilia means air in the biliary tract. It is due to the transfer of air from bowel through the fistula into the biliary tract.
