= Large colon =

Large colon may refer to:

- The large colon forming the first segment of the large intestine in hindgut fermenters, particularly horses, correlating to the ascending colon in humans.
- Megacolon, an abnormal dilation of the colon
