= NAPQI =

Toxic byproduct of acetaminophen

Clinical data
- Other names: N-Acetyl-p-benzoquinone imine; N-Acetylimidoquinone

Identifiers
- IUPAC name: N-(4-Oxo-1-cyclohexa-2,5-dienylidene)acetamide
- CAS Number: 50700-49-7
- PubChem CID: 39763
- IUPHAR/BPS: 6299
- ChemSpider: 36356
- UNII: G6S9BN13TI
- ChEBI: CHEBI:29132
- ChEMBL: ChEMBL33232
- CompTox Dashboard (EPA): DTXSID20198756
- ECHA InfoCard: 100.168.312

Chemical and physical data
- Formula: C_{8}H_{7}NO_{2}
- Molar mass: 149.149 g·mol^{−1}
- 3D model (JSmol): Interactive image
- SMILES: CC(=O)N=c1ccc(=O)cc1
- InChI: InChI=1S/C8H7NO2/c1-6(10)9-7-2-4-8(11)5-3-7/h2-5H,1H3; Key:URNSECGXFRDEDC-UHFFFAOYSA-N

NAPQI, also known as NAPBQI or N-acetyl-p-benzoquinone imine, is a toxic byproduct produced during the xenobiotic metabolism of the analgesic paracetamol (acetaminophen). It is normally produced only in small amounts, and then almost immediately detoxified in the liver.

However, under some conditions in which NAPQI is not effectively detoxified, usually in the case of paracetamol overdose, it causes severe damage to the liver. This becomes apparent 3–4 days after ingestion and may result in death from fulminant liver failure several days after the overdose.

== Metabolism ==
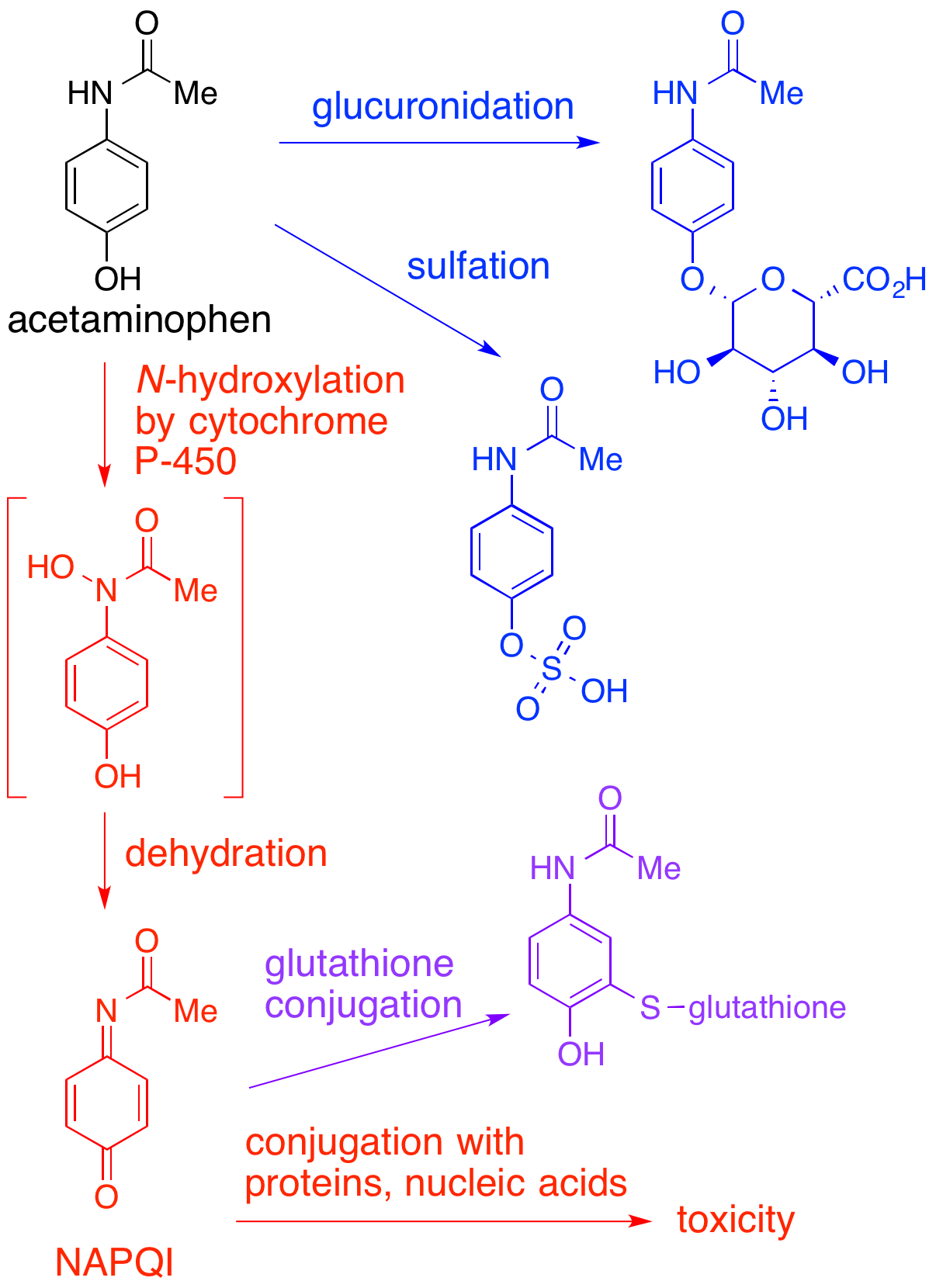
Acetaminophen (paracetamol) metabolism (click to enlarge). Pathways shown in blue and purple lead to non-toxic metabolites; the pathway in red leads to NAPQI, which is toxic if not conjugated to glutathione.

In adults, the primary metabolic pathway for paracetamol is glucuronidation. This yields a relatively non-toxic metabolite, which is excreted into bile and passed out of the body. A small amount of the drug is metabolized via the cytochrome P-450 pathway (to be specific, CYP3A4 and CYP2E1) into NAPQI, which is extremely toxic to liver tissue, as well as being a strong biochemical oxidizer. In an average adult, only a small amount (approximately 10% of a therapeutic paracetamol dose) of NAPQI is produced, which is inactivated by conjugation with glutathione (GSH). The amount of NAPQI produced differs in certain populations.

The minimum dosage at which paracetamol causes toxicity usually is 7.5 to 10g in the average person. The lethal dose is usually between 10 g and 15 g. Concurrent alcohol intake lowers these thresholds significantly. Chronic alcoholics may be more susceptible to adverse effects due to reduced glutathione levels. Other populations may experience effects at lower or higher dosages depending on differences in P-450 enzyme activity and other factors which affect the amount of NAPQI produced. In general, however, the primary concern is accidental or intentional paracetamol overdose.

When a toxic dose of paracetamol is ingested, the normal glucuronide pathway is saturated and large amounts of NAPQI are produced. Liver reserves of glutathione are depleted by conjugation with this excess NAPQI. The mechanism by which toxicity results is complex, but is believed to involve reaction between unconjugated NAPQI and critical proteins as well as increased susceptibility to oxidative stress caused by the depletion of glutathione.

== Poisoning ==
The prognosis is good for paracetamol overdoses if treatment is initiated up to 8 hours after the drug has been taken. Most hospitals stock the antidote (acetylcysteine), which replenishes the liver's supply of glutathione, allowing the NAPQI to be metabolized safely. Without early administration of the antidote, fulminant liver failure follows, often in combination with kidney failure, and death generally occurs within several days.

=== Mechanism and antidote ===
NAPQI becomes toxic when GSH (glutathione) is depleted by an overdose of acetaminophen. Glutathione is an essential antidote to overdose. Glutathione conjugates to NAPQI and helps to detoxify it. In this capacity, it protects cellular protein thiol groups, which would otherwise become covalently modified; when all GSH has been spent, NAPQI begins to bind to certain enzymes like N-10 formyltetrahydrofolate dehydrogenase and glutamate dehydrogenase, reducing their activity and killing the cells in the process. This, along with the depletion of GSH which significantly impairs the function of mitochondria, plays a significant role in the development of paracetamol toxicity.

The preferred treatment for an overdose of this painkiller is the administration of N-acetyl-L-cysteine (either via oral or IV administration), which is processed by cells to L-cysteine and used in the de novo synthesis of GSH.

== See also ==
- Cytochrome P450 oxidase
- Liver failure
- Centrilobular necrosis
