= Pneumoperitoneum =

Abnormal presence of gases in the peritoneal cavity of the abdomen

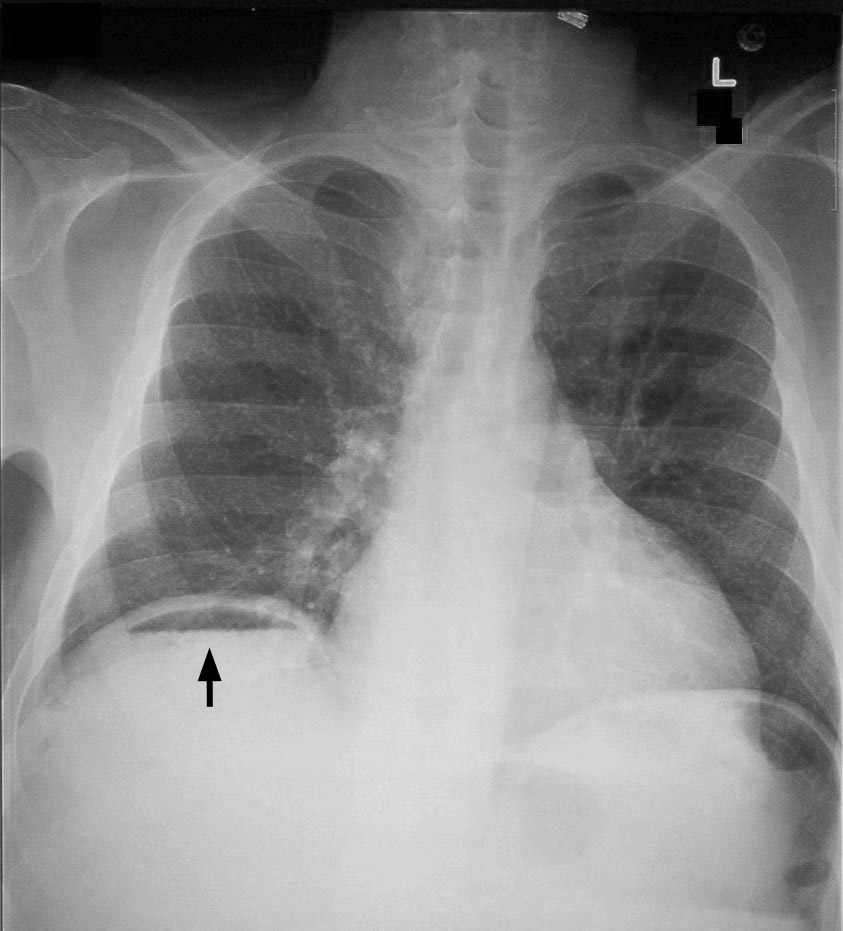
- Frontal chest X-ray. The air bubble below the right hemidiaphragm (on the left of the image) is a pneumoperitoneum.
- Specialty: Gastroenterology

Pneumoperitoneum is pneumatosis (abnormal presence of air or other gas) in the peritoneal cavity, a potential space within the abdominal cavity. The most common cause is a perforated abdominal organ, generally from a perforated peptic ulcer, although any part of the bowel may perforate from a benign ulcer, tumor or abdominal trauma. A perforated appendix rarely causes a pneumoperitoneum.

Spontaneous pneumoperitoneum is a rare case that is not caused by an abdominal organ rupture. This is also called an idiopathic spontaneous pneumoperitoneum when the cause is not known.

In the mid-twentieth century, an "artificial" pneumoperitoneum was sometimes intentionally administered as a treatment for a hiatal hernia. This was achieved by insufflating the abdomen with carbon dioxide. The practice is currently used by surgical teams in order to aid in performing laparoscopic surgery.

== Causes ==
- Perforated duodenal ulcer – The most common cause of rupture in the abdomen. Especially of the anterior aspect of the first part of the duodenum.
- Perforated peptic ulcer
- Bowel obstruction
- Ruptured diverticulum
- Penetrating trauma
- Ruptured inflammatory bowel disease (e.g., megacolon)
- Necrotising enterocolitis/pneumatosis coli
- Bowel cancer
- Ischemic bowel
- Steroids
- After laparotomy
- After laparoscopy
- Breakdown of a surgical anastomosis
- Bowel injury after endoscopy
- Peritoneal dialysis (PD), although the prevalence of pneumoperitoneum is estimated to be less than 4% among people with PD in a more recent study in the United Kingdom.
- Vaginal insufflation (air enters via the fallopian tubes; e.g., water-skiing, oral sex)
- Colonic or peritoneal infection
- From chest (e.g., bronchopleural fistula)
- Non-invasive PAP (positive airway pressure) can force air down duodenum as well as down trachea.

== Spontaneous pneumoperitoneum ==
A spontaneous pneumoperitoneum is a rare case that is not caused by an abdominal organ rupture. This is also called an idiopathic spontaneous pneumoperitoneum when the cause is not known. Causes of a spontaneous pneumoperitoneum, with no peritonitis include a barotrauma due to mechanical ventilation, and a tracheal rupture following an emergency intubation. In the ventilation case, air had passed from the chest into the abdominal cavity through the diaphragm. In the tracheal rupture, air had passed along the great vessels.

== Diagnosis ==
When present, pneumoperitoneum can be seen on projectional radiography, but small amounts are often missed, and CT scan is nowadays regarded as a criterion standard in the assessment of a pneumoperitoneum. CT can visualize quantities as small as 5 cm^{3} of air or gas.

Signs that can be seen on projectional radiography are shown below:

The double wall sign marks the presence of air on both sides of the intestine. However, a false double wall sign can result from two loops of bowel being in contact with one another. The sign is named after Leo George Rigler. It is not the same as Rigler's triad.

The football sign is when the abdomen appears as a large oval radiolucency reminiscent of an American football on a supine projectional radiograph. The football sign is most frequently seen in infants with spontaneous or iatrogenic gastric perforation causing pneumoperitoneum. It is also seen in bowel obstruction with secondary perforation, as in Hirschprung disease, midgut volvulus, meconium ileus and intestinal atresia. Iatrogenic causes like endoscopic perforation may also give football sign.

The Cupola sign is seen when air is accumulated under the central tendon of the diaphragm.

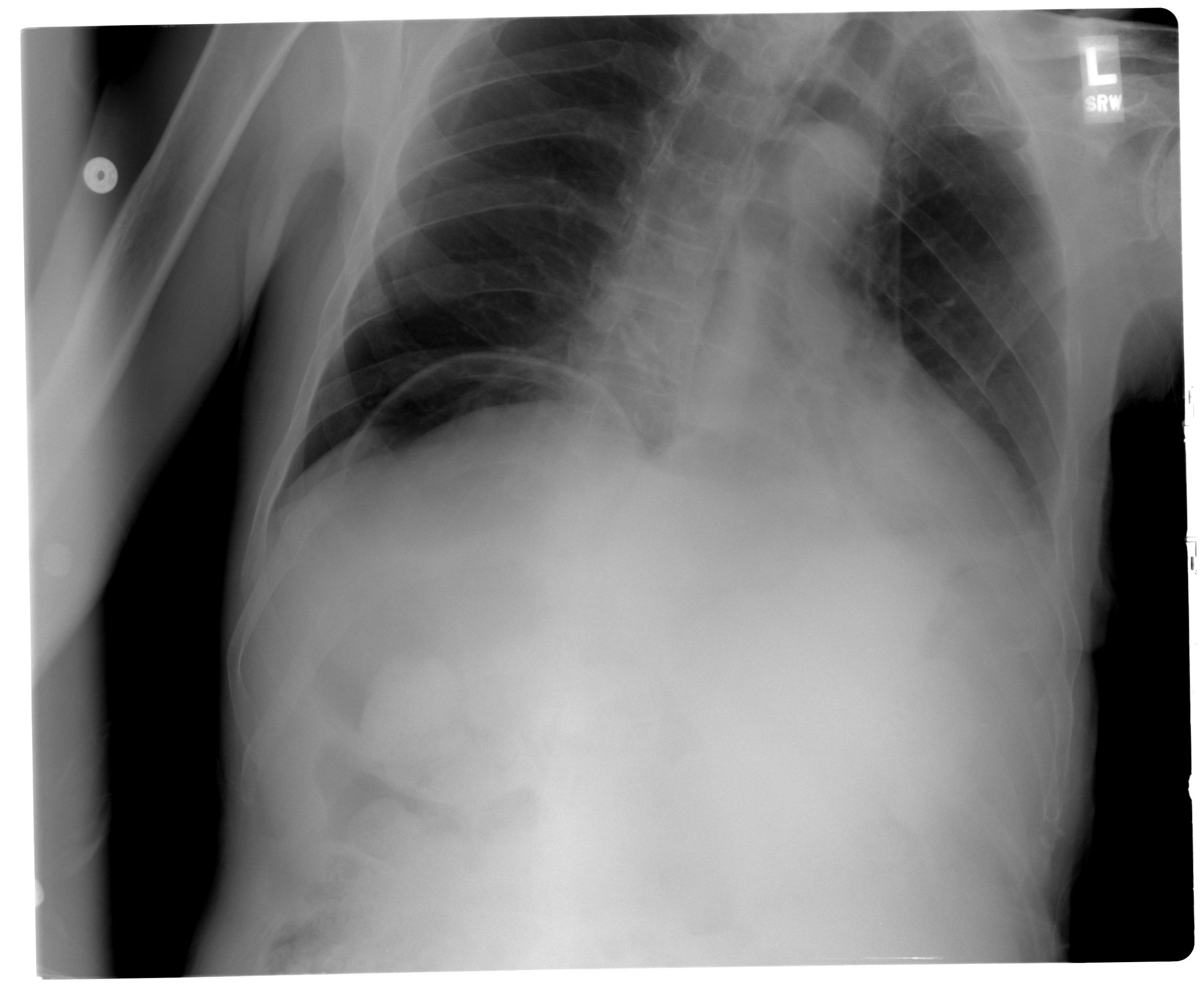
Another pneumoperitoneum on chest X-ray.

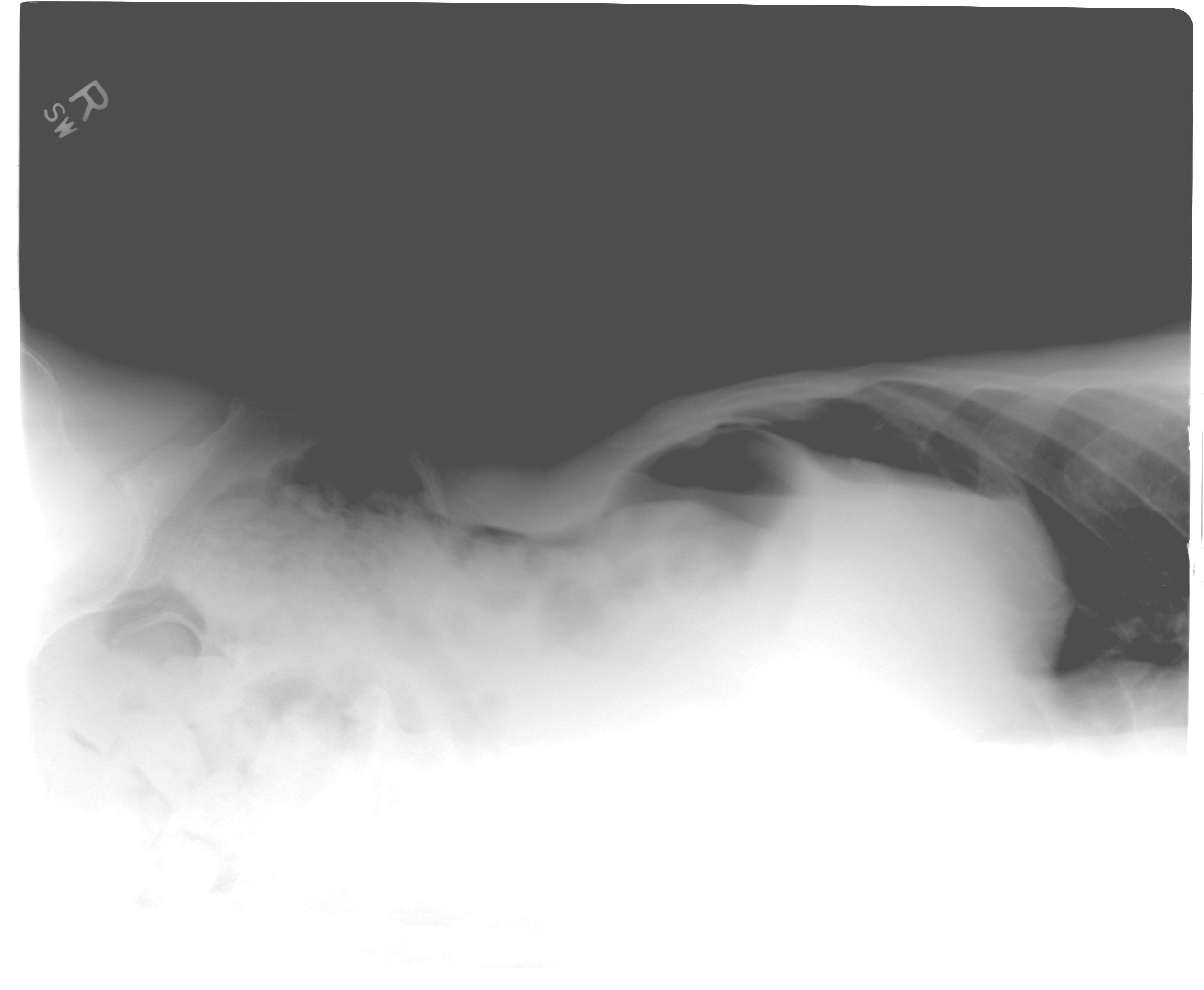
Pneumoperitoneum seen on X-ray with the patient lying on his left side.

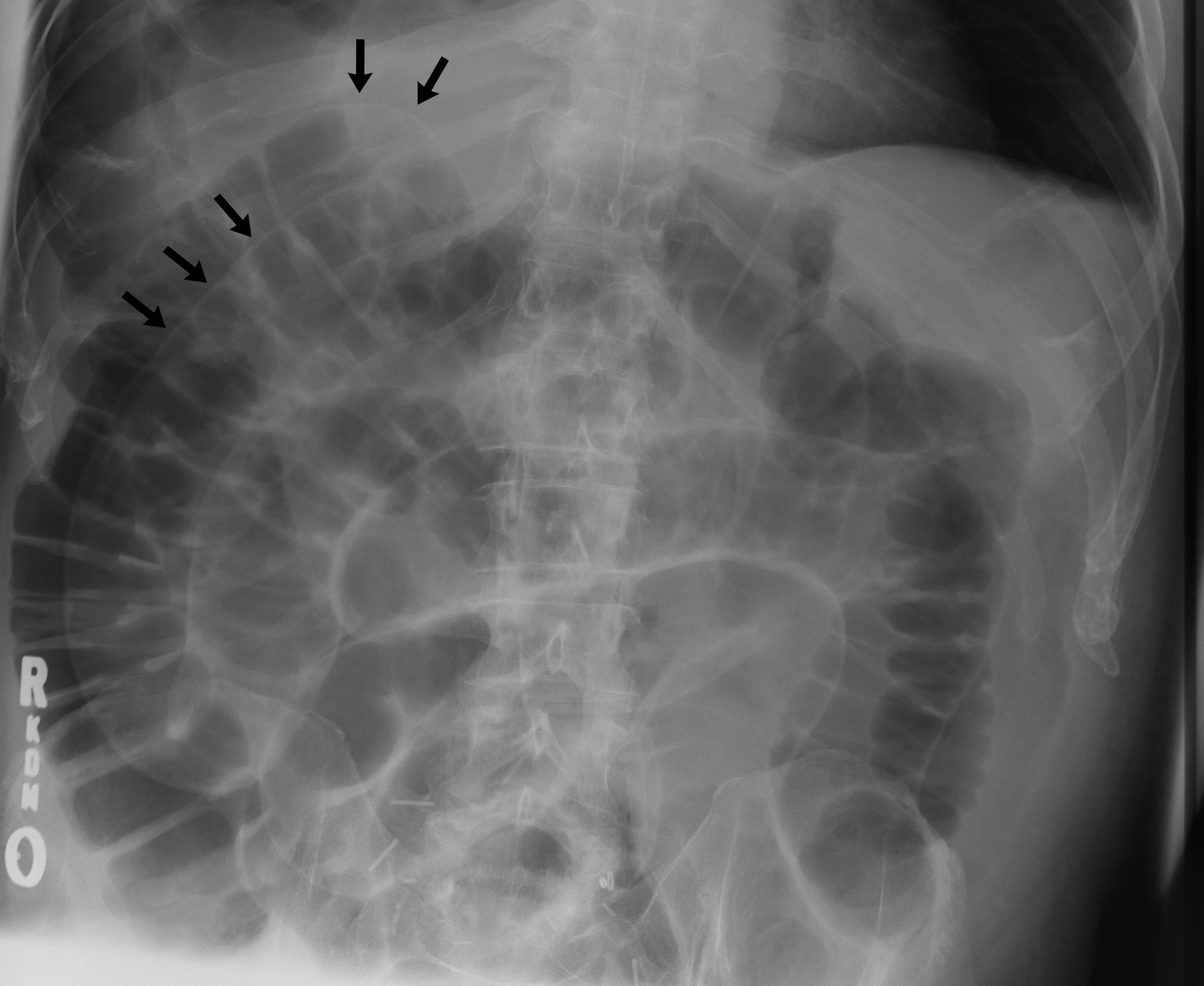
Double wall sign. This is a secondary sign of pneumoperitoneum. Patient is supine, and air within the abdomen and lumen of the bowel accentuate both sides of the bowel wall.

Ultrasound finding of pneumoperitoneum known as "peritoneal stripe sign"

=== Differential diagnosis ===
As differential diagnoses, a subphrenic abscess, bowel interposed between diaphragm and liver (Chilaiditi syndrome), and linear atelectasis at the base of the lungs can simulate free air under the diaphragm on a chest X-ray.

== Treatment ==
Treatment depends on the cause of the condition.

== Terminology ==
Pneumoperitoneum can be described as peritoneal emphysema, just as pneumomediastinum can be called mediastinal emphysema, but pneumoperitoneum is the typical name.

== See also ==
- Cupola sign
- Football sign
- Pneumoretroperitoneum
- Rigler's sign
