= Centrilobular necrosis =

- Other names: Central lobular necrosis, CN
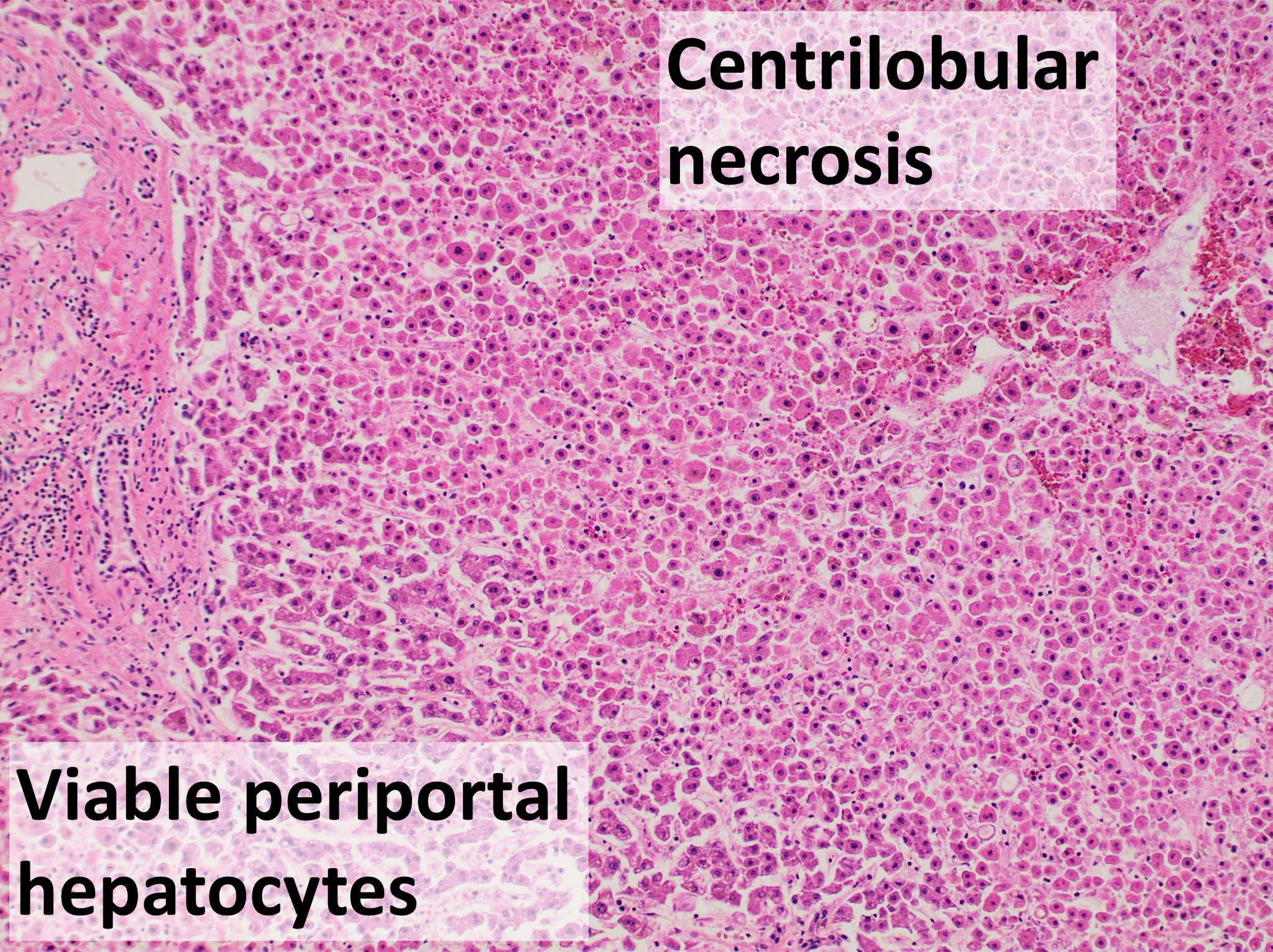
- Histopathology of shock liver (intermediate magnification), showing centrilobular necrosis but viable periportal hepatocytes.

Centrilobular necrosis (CN) is a nonspecific histopathological observation brought on by hepatotoxins like acetaminophen (paracetamol), thioacetamide, tetrachloride, cardiac hepatopathy due to acute right sided cardiac failure, and congestive hepatic injury in veno-occlusive disease, or hypoxic injury due to ischemia. Centrilobular necrosis can also be found in those with autoimmune hepatitis. Centrilobular necrosis is characterized by necrotic hepatocytes completely encircling the central vein.

== Outlook ==
After a single or brief exposure to a toxicant, hepatocytes that have suffered centrilobular necrosis typically heal quickly; the liver can regain its normal appearance under a microscope in about a week. Nevertheless, fibrosis, which may be slight, occurs in the previously necrotic zone surrounding the central vein when regeneration replaces the necrotic hepatocytes if sinusoidal cells and the normal scaffolding are destroyed.

== See also ==
- Hepatotoxicity
- Ischemic hepatitis
