= Aortocaval compression syndrome =

- Other names: Supine hypotensive syndrome
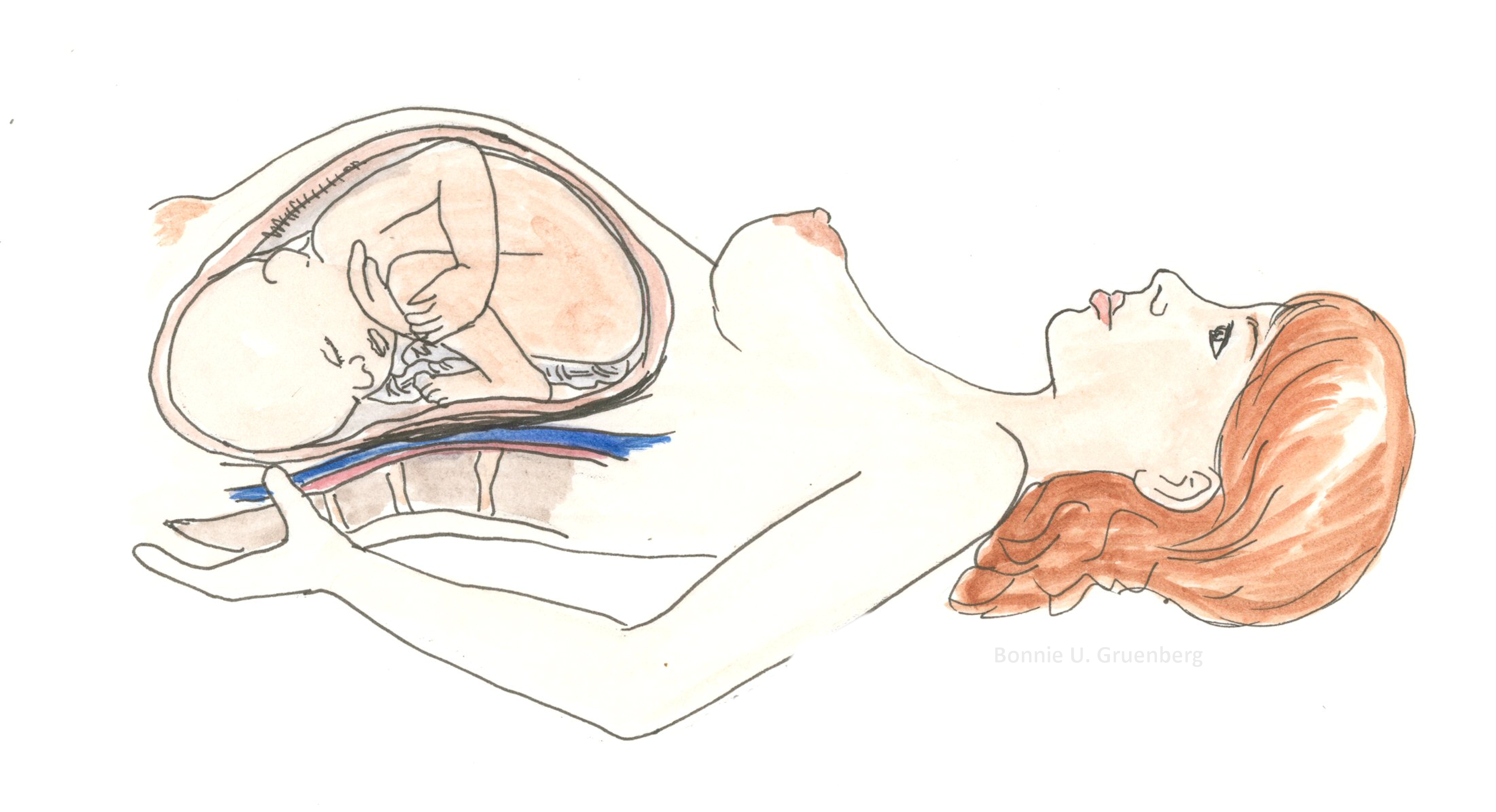
- A watercolor drawing of a pregnant woman lying flat on her back, causing the aorta and inferior vena cava to compress and reduce circulation.
- Specialty: Obstetrics and gynaecology

Aortocaval compression syndrome, also known as supine hypotensive syndrome, is compression of the abdominal aorta and inferior vena cava by the gravid uterus when a pregnant woman lies on her back, i.e. in the supine position. It is a frequent cause of low maternal blood pressure (hypotension), which can result in loss of consciousness and in extreme circumstances fetal demise.

== Signs and symptoms ==
Aortocaval compression syndrome may cause syncope, restlessness, dizziness, headache, tinnitus, visual disturbances, numbness or paresthesia of the limbs, abdominal/chest discomfort or pain, nausea, and vomiting. Some patients may be asymptomatic.

== See also ==
- Inferior vena cava syndrome
- Complications of pregnancy
