= George Budd =

English physician

George Budd M.D. (23 February 1808 – 14 March 1882) was an English physician, medical writer and academic.

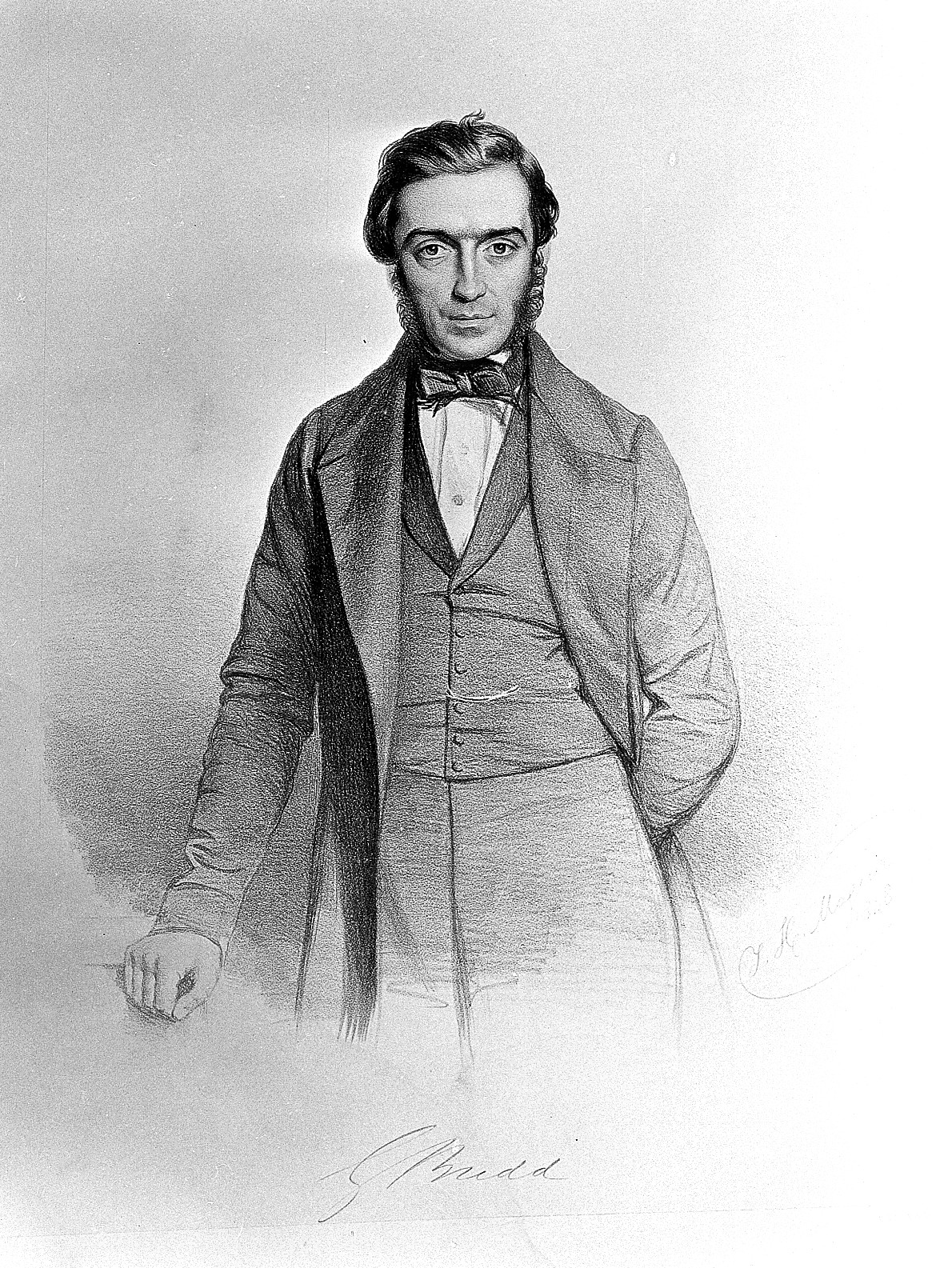
George Budd

== Life ==
He was born at North Tawton, Devon, on 23 February 1808, the third son of Samuel Budd, a surgeon there, and with six brothers entered the medical profession. After education at home, he entered St John's College, Cambridge, in 1827, subsequently migrating to Caius College, and becoming fellow of Caius after taking his degree (third wrangler, 1831).

Budd pursued medical studies in Paris and at the Middlesex Hospital, London, and was elected a Fellow of the Royal Society in 1836. In 1837, while still a M.B., he was appointed physician to the Dreadnought seamen's hospital ship at Greenwich. Here with George Busk he researched cholera, scurvy, and the pathology of the stomach and liver. In 1840 he graduated M.D. at Cambridge and was elected professor of medicine at King's College London, and in 1841 he became a fellow of the Royal College of Physicians, being censor 1845–7.

In 1863 Budd retired from his medical professorship in King's College, of which he was then made an honorary fellow, and in 1867, in poor health, he gave up his large practice in London, and retired to Barnstaple. In 1880 he was made an honorary fellow of Caius College, Cambridge, having ceased to be a fellow many years before, on his marriage. He died 14 March 1882, aged 74.

== Works ==
Budd first came to notice by writing on the stethoscope as an acoustic instrument (Medical Gazette, 1837). His treatise Diseases of the Liver (1845) systematised the practical knowledge of liver diseases for a generation; and described what is now known as Budd–Chiari syndrome, already noticed in 1842 by Carl von Rokitansky. It was followed by Diseases of the Stomach (1855). His report on cases of cholera in the Dreadnought during 1837, written with Busk, and his statistical account of cases collected from the records of the same hospital in the epidemic of 1832, were also standard works, summarised in "Cholera", which Budd contributed to Alexander Tweedie's Library of Practical Medicine, vol. iv.; vol. v. contained his "Scurvy".

Budd published papers and lectures in medical journals, especially the Medical Gazette, including his Gulstonian Lectures (1843) and Croonian Lectures (1847) at the College of Physicians.

== Notes ==
Attribution

This article incorporates text from a publication now in the public domain: Stephen, Leslie, ed. (1886). "Budd, George (1808-1882)". Dictionary of National Biography. Vol. 7. London: Smith, Elder & Co.
