= Chilaiditi syndrome =

- Other names: Chilaiditi's sign
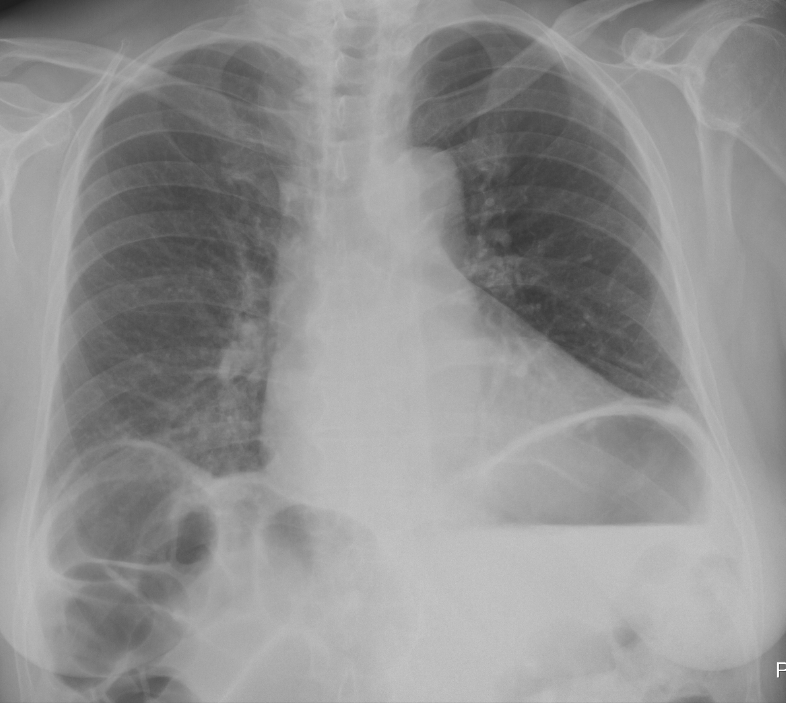
- Chest X-ray showing obvious Chilaiditi's sign, or presence of gas in the right colic angle between the liver and right hemidiaphragm.
- Specialty: General surgery
- Symptoms: Abdominal pain, dyspnea or asymptomatic
- Differential diagnosis: Pneumoperitoneum
- Frequency: 0.1% of adults

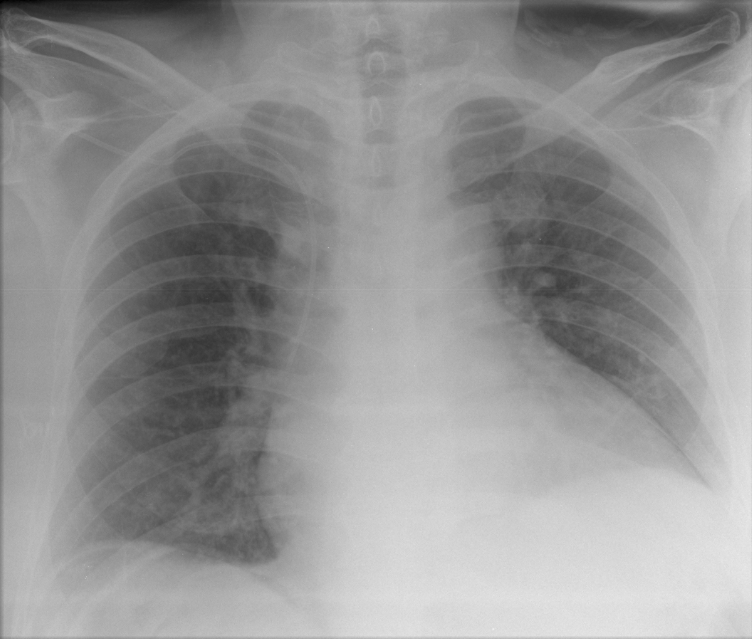
Chest X-ray of the same patient as the picture above. A small crescent of air can be seen under the right part of the diaphragm, caused by Chilaiditi's sign. However, it could easily be mistaken for free intra-abdominal air (pneumoperitoneum) which could mistakenly be attributed to bowel perforation.

Chilaiditi syndrome is a rare condition when pain occurs due to transposition of a loop of large intestine (usually transverse colon) in between the diaphragm and the liver, visible on plain abdominal X-ray or chest X-ray.

Normally this causes no symptoms, and this is called Chilaiditi's sign. The sign can be permanently present, or sporadically. This anatomical variant is sometimes mistaken for the more serious condition of having air under the diaphragm (pneumoperitoneum) which is usually an indication of bowel perforation, possibly leading to surgical interventions.

Chilaiditi syndrome refers only to complications in the presence of Chilaiditi's sign. These include abdominal pain, torsion of the bowel (transverse colon volvulus) or shortness of breath.

== Causes ==
The exact cause is not always known, but it may occur in patients with a long and mobile colon (dolichocolon), chronic lung disease such as emphysema, or liver problems such as cirrhosis and ascites. Chilaiditi's sign is generally not associated with symptoms, and is most commonly an incidental finding in normal individuals.

Absence or laxity of the ligament suspending the transverse colon or of the falciform ligament are also thought to contribute to the condition. It can also be associated with relative atrophy of the medial segment of the left lobe of the liver. In this case, the gallbladder position is often anomalous as well – it is often located anterior to the liver, rather than posterior.

== Epidemiology ==
The occurrence (incidence) on abdominal or chest X-rays is around 0.1% but it can be up to 1% in series of older adults. It has also been reported in children.

== History ==
Chilaiditi's sign is named after the Greek radiologist Dimítrios Chilaiditi, born in 1883, who first described it when he was working in Vienna in 1910.

== Synonyms ==
Synonyms include interpositio hepatodiaphragmatica, subphrenic displacement of the colon, subphrenic interposition syndrome and pseudopneumoperitoneum.
