= Robert Austrian =

American physician

- Born: April 12, 1916
- Died: March 25, 2007 (aged 90)
- Education: Johns Hopkins University
- Scientific career
- Workplaces: University of Pennsylvania

Robert Austrian (Baltimore, 12 April 1916 – Philadelphia, 25 March 2007) was an American infectious diseases physician and, along with Maxwell Finland, one of the two most important researchers into the biology of Streptococcus pneumoniae in the 20th century.

== Education ==
Austrian received his MD from Johns Hopkins University and did his fellowships in Infectious Diseases at Johns Hopkins and New York University. He went on to found the Infectious Diseases division and fellowship program at the University of Pennsylvania School of Medicine and held the endower Robert Herr Musser chair there from 1962-1986. He later continued research at Kings County Hospital and SUNY Downstate Health Sciences University.

Austrian's awards include the Maxwell Finland plenary lecture at the Infectious Diseases Society of America annual session in 1974, entitled “Random gleanings from a life with the pneumococcus” and the 1978 Albert Lasker Clinical Medical Research Award. His Lasker award was for the development and clear demonstration of the efficacy of a purified vaccine of capsular polysaccharides in the prevention of pneumococcal disease. Prior to the Austrian polysaccharide vaccine scientists had prepared simpler whole bacteria and capsular polysaccharide vaccines but they were not accepted as standard of care by the medical community. Several medical authorities touted this era as “the end of infectious diseases” due to the remarkable mortality benefits derived from new antimicrobials and anti-parasitics and vaccine research was not thought to be worthwhile.

== Career ==
When antibiotics came into use for the cure of pneumococcal infections in the 1950s and 60s, further pneumococcal vaccine development was abandoned. Austrian chose to focus on prevention rather than antibiotic treatment of this debilitating disease. Beginning with surveillance studies which he conducted revealed that despite antibiotic therapy, there were still, in the 1960s, almost half as many deaths from pneumonia in the United States as there were at the turn of the century. Austrian also established that persons over 50 years of age, and those with chronic debilitating diseases were the largest group at risk. Austrian established a tremendous knowledge base of pneumococcal biology. He analyzed 83 known types of pneumococci, and determined 14 types were responsible for 80% of invasive pneumococcal infections in man, and that the outer coatings or capsules of these organisms should be included in an effective vaccine. Austrian then devised a multi-valent polysaccharide vaccine and then played a major role in the successful clinical trials which resulted in its licensure.

His Lasker award reads as follows “For his persistent, dedicated efforts which permitted the development of a vaccine that soon may significantly reduce human disease caused by the pneumococcus, this Albert Lasker Clinical Medical Research Award is given.”

Robert Austrian also gives rise to the medical eponym "Austrian syndrome" which describes the clinical syndrome of pneumococcal meningitis, pneumonia and endocarditis, after his 1957 paper in Archives of Internal Medicine.
