= Pneumoretroperitoneum =

Pneumoretroperitoneum is the presence of air in the retroperitoneum. It is always a pathological condition and can be caused by a perforation of a retroperitoneal hollow organ such as the duodenum, colon or rectum. Pneumoretroperitoneum can best be identified by CT scan.

== See also ==
- Pneumoperitoneum
