= Dolichocolon =

Congenitally long large intestine

- Other names: Redundant colon, tortuous colon, floppy colon
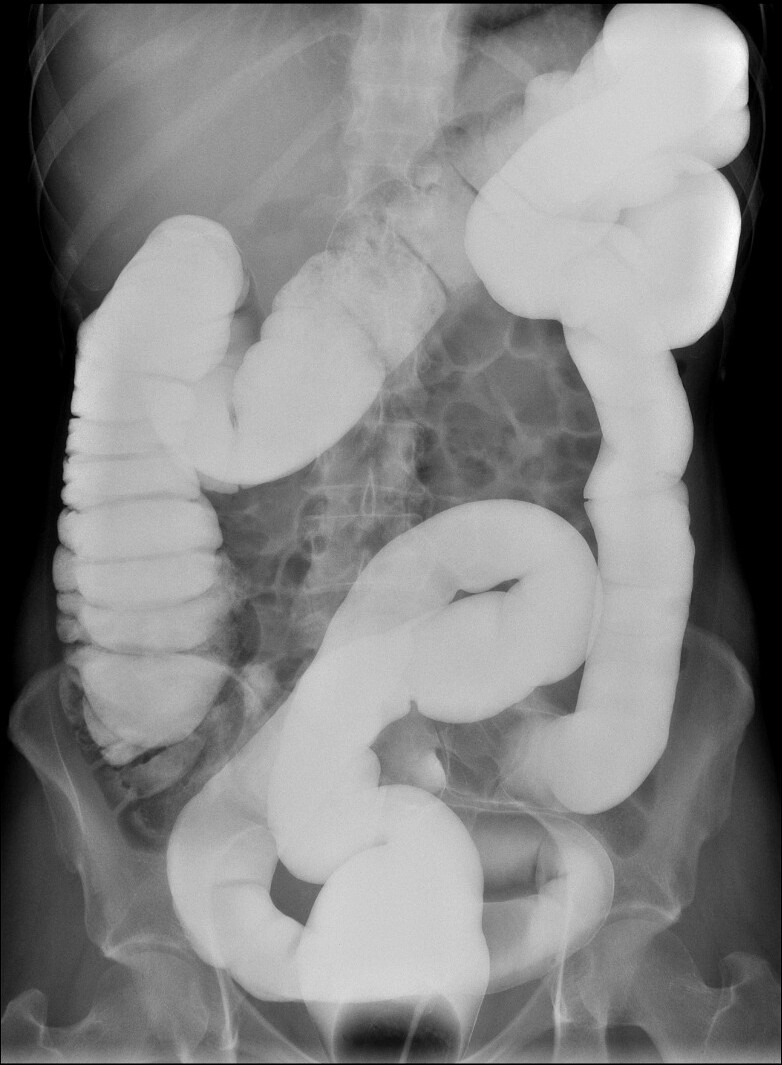
- Abdominal X-ray image with bowel contrast agent showing dolichocolon
- Specialty: Gastroenterology, colorectal surgery, general surgery
- Complications: Volvulus, Chilaiditi syndrome
- Usual onset: From birth
- Duration: Indefinite
- Causes: Unknown
- Diagnostic method: Abdominal X-ray, colonoscopy
- Differential diagnosis: Megacolon
- Prognosis: Most commonly asymptomatic

Dolichocolon, also known as redundant colon or tortuous colon, is the congenital presence of an abnormally-long large intestine.‍ It should not be confused with an abnormally wide large intestine, which is called megacolon. The name originates from Ancient Greek: δολιχός, romanized: dolĭkhós, lit. 'long, protracted', and "colon".

Dolichocolon may predispose to abnormal rotation of the colon (volvulus) and its interposition between the diaphragm and the liver (Chilaiditi syndrome). The exact cause remains unknown.‍ Dolichocolon is often an incidental finding on abdominal X-rays or in colonoscopy. It is not by itself a disease and as such requires no treatment if asymptomatic. In colonoscopies, dolichocolon can make progression of the endoscope very difficult, requiring external manipulation to reach the terminal ileum, and depending on the degree of dolichocolon, manipulation under general anesthesia may be preferred
