= Ischemic hepatitis =

- Other names: Ischemic hepatopathy, Shock liver
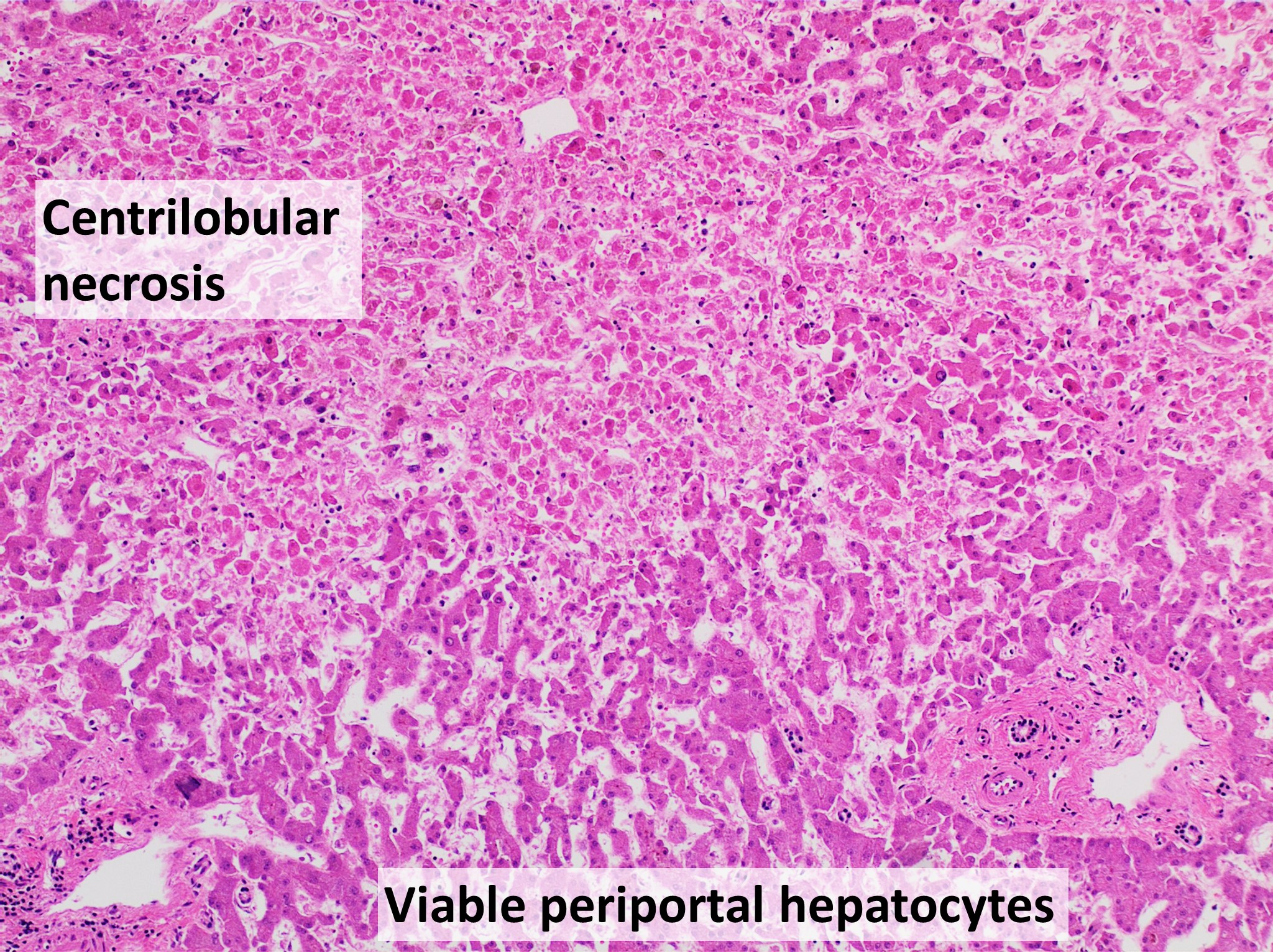
- Histopathology of shock liver, showing its hallmark pathologic finding centrilobular necrosis but viable periportal hepatocytes. H&E stain. The necrotic hepatocytes have barely discernible nuclei.
- Symptoms: Mental confusion
- Causes: Heart failure, Infection
- Diagnostic method: Doppler ultrasound, Blood test
- Treatment: Resuscitation(acute), Stabilize underlining illness(chronic)

Ischemic hepatitis, also known as shock liver, is a condition defined as an acute liver injury caused by insufficient blood flow (and consequently insufficient oxygen delivery) to the liver. The decreased blood flow (perfusion) to the liver is usually due to shock or low blood pressure. However, local causes involving the hepatic artery that supplies oxygen to the liver, such as a blood clot in the hepatic artery, can also cause ischemic hepatitis.

== Signs and symptoms ==
People who develop ischemic hepatitis may have weakness, fatigue, mental confusion, and low urine production (oliguria). A small percentage of affected people may develop hepatic coma. Yellow discoloration of the skin (jaundice) can occur, but is rare and temporary, as is actual loss of function of the liver.

== Cause ==
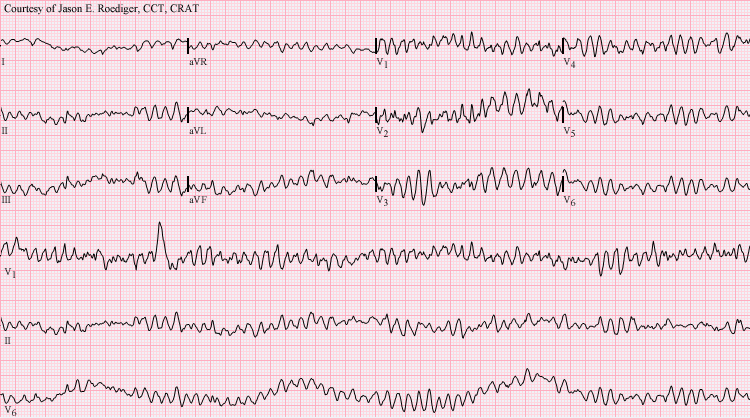
Arrhythmia (ventricular fibrillation)

Ischemic hepatitis can be caused by a number of reasons (that lead to low blood pressure) including:

- Abnormal heart rhythm
- Heart failure
- Infection
- Hypovolemic shock (e.g., due to profuse bleeding)
- Blood clots (hepatic artery after surgery)

== Mechanism ==
The mechanism of ischemic hepatitis depends on the etiopathogenetic origin, be it a cardiomyopathy, cardiac tamponade, trauma, or bleeding. Usually ischemic hepatitis reveals itself after a hypotensive event with increased levels of aminotransferases. Because of this, hypotension is thought to be one of the primary insults leading to ischemic hepatitis.

== Diagnosis ==
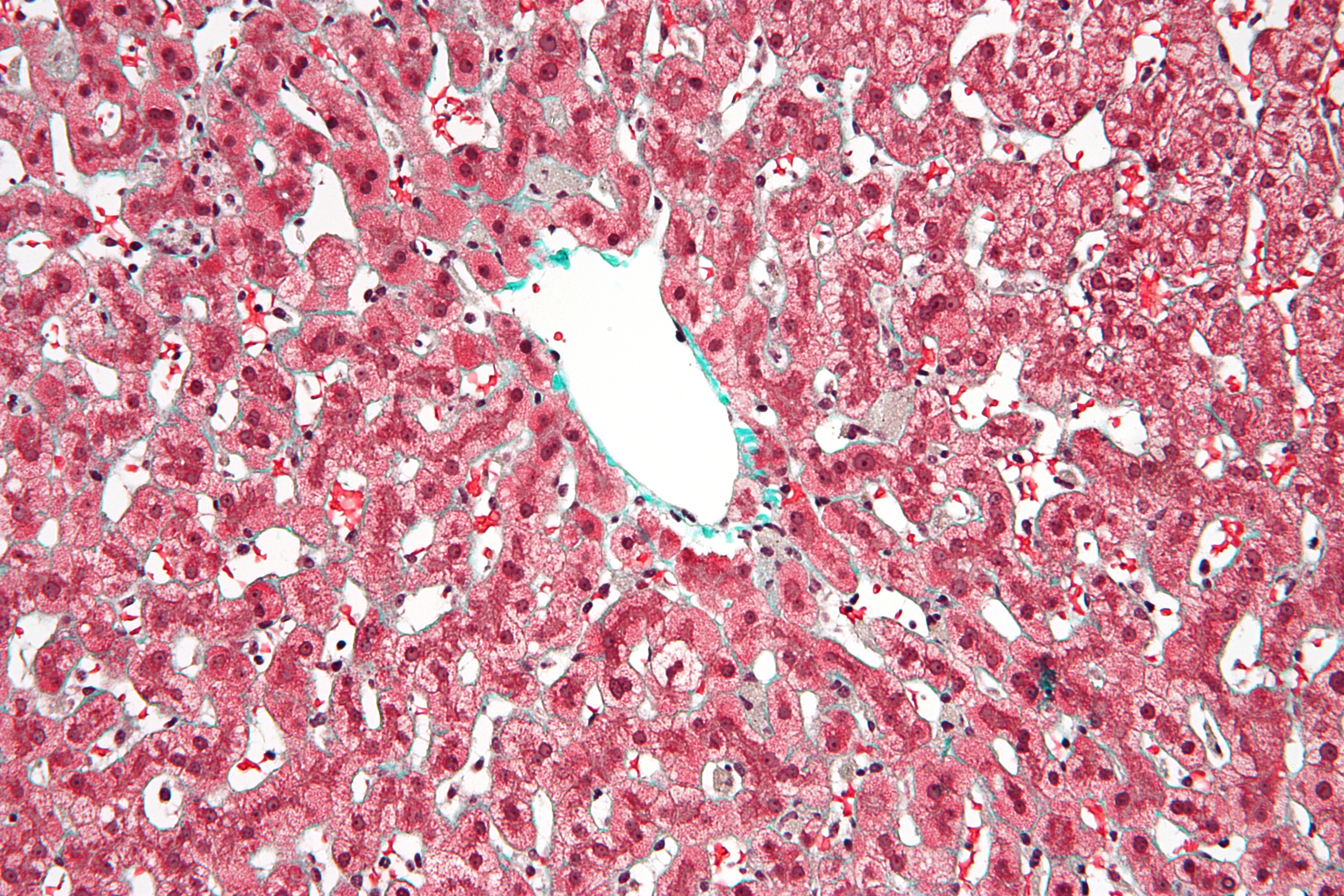
Congestive hepatopathy

Blood testing usually shows markedly high elevations of both liver transaminase enzymes, AST and ALT, which may exceed 10,000 U/L. It has been found that those who suffer from ischemic hepatitis had significant cardiac disease as well.As a measure of precaution, paracetamol levels and a toxicology screening should be completed to evaluate for possible toxin-mediated injury; it is also imperative to be able to exclude the possibility of acute viral hepatitis.

=== Related conditions ===
Ischemic hepatitis is related to another condition called congestive hepatopathy. Congestive hepatopathy includes a number of liver disorders that occur in right-sided heart failure. The medical term congestive hepatopathy is used, however, the term cardiac cirrhosis is convention. These two entities can coexist in an affected individual.

== Treatment ==
The treatment of ischemic hepatitis is as follows:

- Antibiotic treatment if a bacterial infection causing septic shock is present
- Restore and maintain adequate blood pressure
- Medication
- Control any gastrointestinal bleeding

== See also ==
- Elevated transaminases
