= Leo George Rigler =

American radiologist (1896–1979)

Leo George Rigler (16 October 1896 in Minneapolis – 25 October 1979) was an American radiologist remembered for describing Rigler's sign.

== Biography ==
Leo Rigler attended the University of Minnesota, receiving a B.S. in 1917, B.M. in 1919 and M.D. in 1920. He undertook his internship at the St. Louis City Hospital where he watched pioneering radiologist Dr. Leroy Sante perform fluoroscopy, and realised the potential of this new technique. He worked as a general practitioner in New England, North Dakota, but returned to the University of Minnesota after a short time. He then worked as a teaching fellow in internal medicine for a year, becoming responsible for the radiology service. He then undertook a 3-year post as radiologist at the Minneapolis General Hospital. During this time he also trained in radiology at the Battle Creek Sanatorium and the University of Michigan.

In 1924 he travelled to Europe with funding from the University of Minnesota Medical School. He spent most of the year in Stockholm at the Karolinska Institute. On his return he was appointed associate professor of radiology at the age of 31, and became full professor two years later. He was certified by the American Board of Radiology in 1934, the 68th person to be recognised in this way. He founded a postgraduate radiology course in 1936. He became the first full-time chairman of radiology at the University of Minnesota in 1933 at the age of 37, a position he held until 1957.

He then moved to California, becoming the executive director of the Cedars-Sinai Medical Center until 1963. He then became professor of radiology at the University of California, Los Angeles at the age of 67, and directed the postgraduate radiology training. He continued in this post until his death in 1979.

After the Second World War he worked with the World Health Organization to improve clinical radiology in a number of countries including India, Iran and Israel. He published over 200 articles and edited six books. The radiology research facility at UCLA was opened in 1971 and named the Leo G. Rigler Center for Radiological Sciences.

A collection of his papers is held at the National Library of Medicine in Bethesda, Maryland.
