= Pneumobilia =

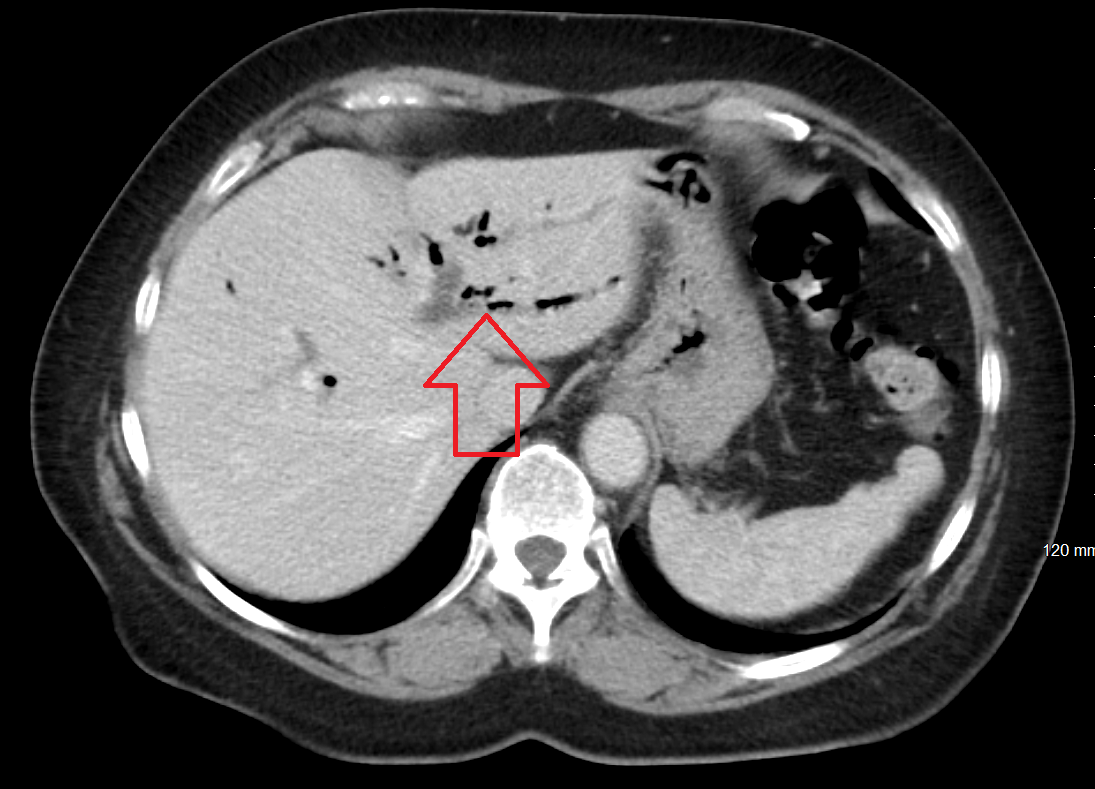
- CT scan of pneumobilia

Pneumobilia is the presence of gas in the biliary system. It is typically detected by ultrasound or a radiographic imaging exam, such as CT, or MRI. It is a common finding in patients that have recently undergone biliary surgery or endoscopic biliary procedure. While the presence of air within biliary system is not harmful, this finding may alternatively suggest a pathological process, such as a biliary-enteric anastomosis, an infection of the biliary system, an incompetent sphincter of Oddi, or spontaneous biliary-enteric fistula.

== Causes ==
In a healthy individual with normal anatomy, there is no air within the biliary tree. When this finding is present, it may be secondary to:

- Recent surgical or endoscopic biliary procedure (e.g. ERCP, biliary enteric anastomosis)
- Incompetent sphincter of Oddi (e.g. passage of large gallstone, scarring related to chronic pancreatitis)
- Spontaneous biliary enteric fistula (e.g. gallstone ileus)
- Infection by gas-forming organisms (e.g. emphysematous cholangitis)
- Congenital abnormalities

Other rare causes that have been reported include duodenal diverticulum, paraduodenal abscess, operative trauma, and carcinoma of the duodenum, stomach and bile duct.
