= Gradenigo's syndrome =

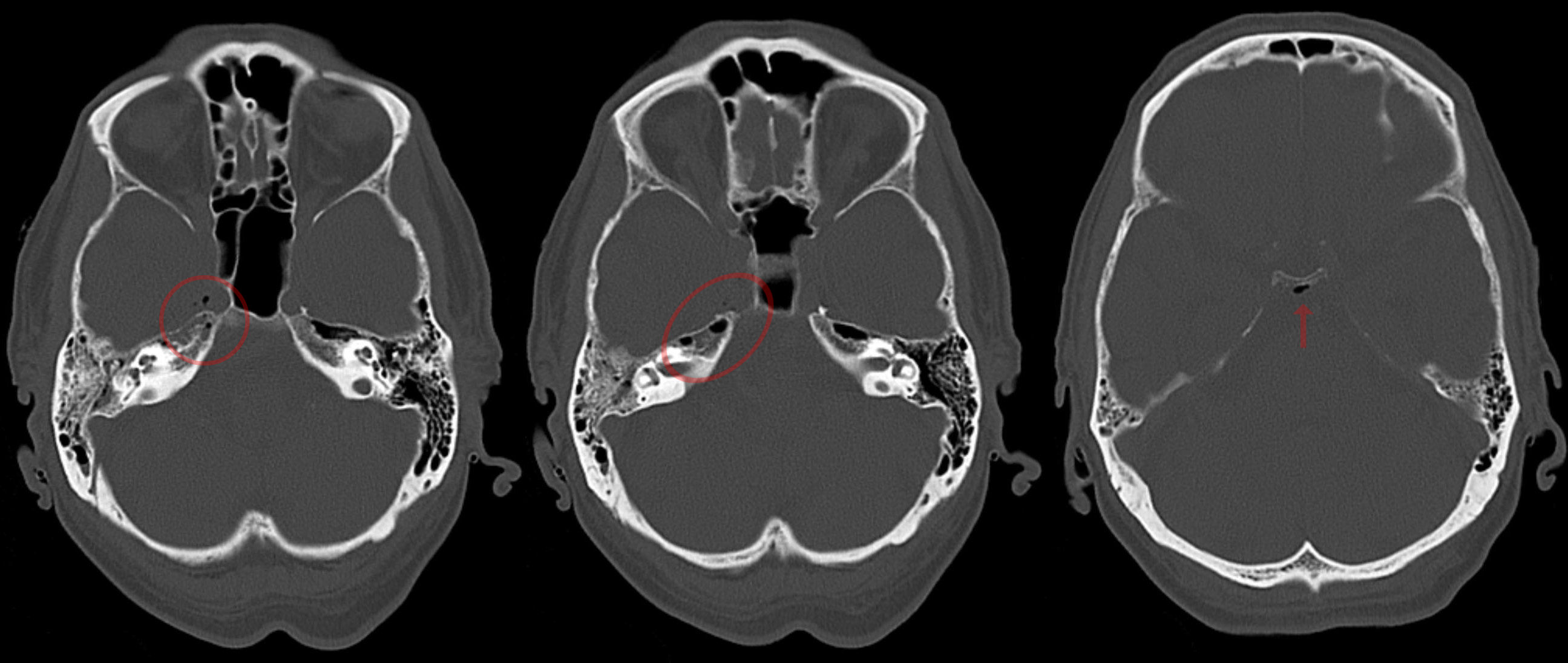
- Apicitis petrosa as seen in computed tomography
- Specialty: Otorhinolaryngology

Gradenigo's syndrome, also called Gradenigo-Lannois syndrome, is a complication of otitis media and mastoiditis involving the apex of the petrous temporal bone. It was first described by Giuseppe Gradenigo in 1904.

== Symptoms ==
Components of the syndrome include:

- retroorbital pain due to pain in the area supplied by the ophthalmic branch of the trigeminal nerve (fifth cranial nerve)
- abducens nerve palsy (sixth cranial nerve)
- otitis media

Other symptoms can include photophobia, excessive lacrimation, fever, and reduced corneal sensitivity. The syndrome is classically caused by the spread of an infection into the petrous apex of the temporal bone.

== Diagnosis ==
The constellation of symptoms was first described as a consequence of severe, advanced ear infection which has spread to a central portion of the temporal bone of the skull. This type of presentation was common prior to development of antibiotic treatments, and is now a rare complication.

In persons with longstanding ear infection and typical symptoms, medical imaging such as CT or MRI of the head may show changes that confirm disease involvement of the petrous apex of temporal bone.

== Treatment ==
The medical treatment is done with antibiotics: ceftriaxone plus metronidazole (which covers anaerobic bacteria). Depending on the duration of the infection, the severity, and which complications have arisen, it may also be necessary to perform surgery. Due to critical structures that block surgical access, it is not possible to completely remove the petrous apex. The focus is therefore on providing adequate drainage of the affected air cells.

== Eponym ==
It is named after Count Giuseppe Gradenigo, an Italian otolaryngologist, and Maurice Lannois.
