= Murphy's triad =

- Differential diagnosis: appendicitis

Murphy's triad is a collection of three signs and symptoms associated with acute appendicitis, a medical emergency which presents with lower right abdominal pain (Right Lower Quadrant; RLQ), along with nausea, vomiting, and fever.

== Components of Murphy's triad ==
A mnemonic to remember Murphy's triad is PVT Murphy: Pain, Vomiting, Temperature. The triad consists of:

- Pain
- Vomiting
- Fever

== History ==
Murphy's triad was named after John Benjamin Murphy, an American physician and abdominal surgeons and one of the earliest advocates for the intervention of the removal of the appendix in all cases of appendicitis. According to the British Medical Journal, Murphy's triad consists of "pain in the abdomen followed by nausea or vomiting, and general abdominal sensitiveness on the right side, followed by an elevated body temperature." Although the original notes on Murphy's triad includes four signs (the fourth being a rise in temperature), it may be noted that "it is evident that it is not a constant feature throughout an attack and [that] the elevation of temperature may be absent at certain stages and in certain circumstances."
