= Austrian syndrome =

Medical condition

- Other names: Osler's triad
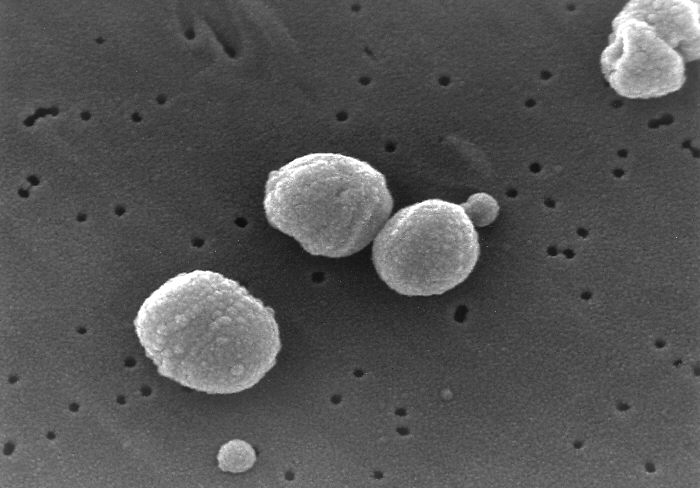
- Streptococcus pneumoniae is the leading cause of Austrian syndrome.
- Symptoms: Pneumonia, Endocarditis, and Meningitis
- Causes: Streptococcus pneumoniae
- Risk factors: Alcoholism.
- Diagnostic method: Rapid diagnostic test, X-Ray imaging, and Electrocardiogram
- Prevention: Decreased alcohol consumption.
- Treatment: Treatment of Pneumonia, Endocarditis, and Meningitis
- Prognosis: Mortality rate of 32%.
- Frequency: Fewer than 60 cases reported.
- Named after: Robert Austrian

Austrian syndrome, also known as Osler's triad, is a medical condition that was named after Robert Austrian in 1957. The presentation of the condition consists of pneumonia, endocarditis, and meningitis, all caused by Streptococcus pneumoniae. It is associated with alcoholism due to hyposplenism (reduced splenic functioning) and can be seen in males between the ages of 40 and 60 years old. Robert Austrian was not the first one to describe the condition, but Richard Heschl (around 1860s) or William Osler were not able to link the signs to the bacteria because microbiology was not yet developed.

== Epidemiology ==
Signs of Austrian syndrome usually begin in Caucasian males over 40. A study shows that middle-aged men with alcohol issues make up most patients with Austrian syndrome.

== Causes ==
The leading cause of Osler's triad (Austrian syndrome) is Streptococcus pneumoniae, which is usually associated with heavy alcohol use. The condition was named Osler's triad because of its associations with pneumonia, meningitis, and endocarditis. Excessive consumption of alcohol would put the user at risk. It was determined that alcoholism completed the tetrad of associated conditions.

The oldest recorded patient with Austrian syndrome had a history of health concerns such as hypertension, and diabetes mellitus which increased her risk of Austrian syndrome.

== Pathophysiology ==
Osler's triad, also known as Austrian syndrome, was first introduced in the 19th century. Streptococcus pneumoniae is the cause of Osler's triad of meningitis, pneumonia, and endocarditis. The portal of entry for this triad is said to be the lungs, followed by meningitis and endocarditis. Significant risk factors are heavy alcohol consumption, old age, splenectomy, immunosuppression, etc. Endocarditis typically involves the aortic valve. The native aortic valve is the most frequent vegetation site for Streptococcus pneumoniae and is considered the most common cardiac lesion. In fact, it is a historic misnomer because Richard Heschl described the signs before Osler did, but he described this in German, so it got lost in the literature and the name was Osler's triad.

== Signs and symptoms ==
The presentation of Austrian syndrome includes symptoms from all three of the triad: pneumonia, endocarditis, and meningitis. Cough-producing mucus, shortness of breath, and chest pains during cough are associated with pneumonia.

== Diagnosis ==
Early diagnosis of Austrian syndrome is beneficial. The disease is usually diagnosed later in an individual's life because it mostly affects older Caucasian men. Multiple tests are performed to determine if an individual has Austrian syndrome. Bacterial cultivation is the main method in diagnosing Streptococcus pneumoniae.

Rapid diagnostic test is when a liquid sample of the ear or nasal discharge is collected. In terms of Streptococcus pneumoniae, it is also used to confirm the causative bacterium.

X-Ray imaging of the chest is performed to determine lung inflammation and aortic regurgitation.

Echocardiography is used to look at the valves, and blood cultures are taken to isolate the bacteria. A physical exam is performed on lung and heart cavities and a spinal tap is also performed to collect cerebrospinal fluid.

== Treatment ==
Since Austrian syndrome consists of meningitis, pneumonia and endocarditis, there are separate treatments for each. Pneumonia and endocarditis are usually treated with beta-lactam therapy penicillin, which has been said to be the most effective but sources have said that some bacterial strains are resistant to penicillin. High doses of penicillin do not affect pneumonia. Before penicillin was used for treatment, pneumococcus was a cause of several endocarditis cases. Also, for endocarditis, a valve replacement would be performed to avoid cardiogenic shock. For meningitis, intravenous antibiotics are used. Earlier studies suggest that dexamethasone improved the outcome of adults with pneumococcal meningitis. In a specific case study, a patient who had symptoms of a fever and headache was treated with cefotaxime, ampicillin, and dexamethasone and had to undergo an emergency valve surgery since the EKG showed mitral vegetation.

== Prognosis ==
In the 19th century, the mortality rate of Austrian syndrome was about 75%; it has since decreased to approximately 32%. The mortality percentage is higher in immunocompromised individuals. Austrian syndrome's symptoms, including pneumonia, endocarditis, and meningitis, all have high mortality rates.

== Prevention ==
Decreased alcohol consumption is an effective way to lower the chances of developing Austrian syndrome. The incidence rate has reduced since the introduction of beta-lactam therapy in the early 1940s. Additionally, the introduction of the pneumococcal vaccination in 1977 further decreased the incidence of infection. However, 14% of patients don't have risk factors.

== Research ==
Due to the rarity of the syndrome, with fewer than 60 cases reported, there has not been much research on the disease. However, there have been multiple case studies that discuss certain treatments, preventions, and diagnoses, depending on the individual. In a case study, an individual who had absolutely no history of alcohol abuse presented symptoms of the triad, such as low fever, myalgia, cough, and breathlessness. He had abnormal pupils, which indicated injury to the brain. A CT scan was performed, and CSF analysis showed 78 cells/mm^{3} a low glucose concentration, and positive latex agglutination. The individual was treated with Ceftriaxone which caused the aortic valve to swell up so Vancomycin and Carbapenam were used next in the treatment process and the individual responded well and was able to recover at home with intensive therapy. So antibiotics are used as tools of treatment. In another case of Austrian syndrome, a 76-year old woman with diabetes mellitus, hypertension and chronic cervical and lumbar degenerative disease presented with the disease.
