= Portopulmonary hypertension =

- Other names: Pulmonary arterial hypertension associated with portal hypertension
- Specialty: Pulmonology, Hepatology

Portopulmonary hypertension (PPH) is defined by the coexistence of portal and pulmonary hypertension. PPH is a serious complication of liver disease, present in 0.25 to 4% of all patients with cirrhosis. Once an absolute contraindication to liver transplantation, it is no longer, thanks to rapid advances in the treatment of this condition. Today, PPH is comorbid in 4-6% of those referred for a liver transplant.

== Presentation ==
PPH presents roughly equally in male and female cirrhotics; 71% female in an American series and 57% male in a larger French series. Typically, patients present in their fifth decade, aged 49 +/- 11 years on average.

In general, PPH is diagnosed 4–7 years after the patient is diagnosed with portal hypertension and in roughly 65% of cases, the diagnosis is actually made at the time of invasive hemodynamic monitoring following anesthesia induction prior to liver transplantation.

Once patients are symptomatic, they present with right heart dysfunction secondary to pulmonary hypertension and its consequent dyspnea, fatigue, chest pain and syncope. Patients tend to have a poor cardiac status, with 60% having stage III-IV NYHA heart failure.

PPH is actually independent of the severity of cirrhosis but may be more common in specific types of cirrhosis, in one series more so in autoimmune hepatitis and less in hepatitis C cirrhosis, while in another it was equally distributed throughout the diagnoses.

== Pathophysiology ==
PPH pathology arises both from the humoral consequences of cirrhosis and the mechanical obstruction of the portal vein. A central paradigm holds responsible an excess local pulmonary production of vasoconstrictors that occurs while vasodilatation predominates systemically. Key here are imbalances between vasodilatory and vasoconstricting molecules; endogenous prostacyclin and thromboxane (from Kupffer cells) or nitric oxide (NO) and endothelin-1 (ET-1). ET-1 is the most potent vasoconstrictor under investigation and it has been found to be increased in both cirrhosis and pulmonary hypertension. Endothelin-1 has two receptors in the pulmonary arterial tree, ET-A which mediates vasoconstriction and ET-B which mediates vasodilation. Rat models have shown decreased ET-B receptor expression in pulmonary arteries of cirrhotic and portal hypertensive animals, leading to a predominant vasoconstricting response to endothelin-1.

In portal hypertension, blood will shunt from portal to systemic circulation, bypassing the liver. This leaves unmetabolized potentially toxic or vasoconstricting substances to reach and attack the pulmonary circulation. Serotonin, normally metabolized by the liver, is returned to the lung instead where it mediates smooth muscle hyperplasia and hypertrophy. Moreover, a key pathogenic factor in the decline in status of PPH patients related to this shunting is the cirrhotic cardiomyopathy with myocardial thickening and diastolic dysfunction.

Finally, the pulmonary pathology of PPH is very similar to that of primary pulmonary hypertension. The muscular pulmonary arteries become fibrotic and hypertrophy while the smaller arteries lose smooth muscle cells and their elastic intima. One study found at autopsy significant thickening of pulmonary arteries in cirrhotic patients. This thickening and remodeling forms a positive feedback loop that serves to increase PAP and induce right heart hypertrophy and dysfunction.

== Diagnosis ==
The diagnosis of portopulmonary hypertension is based on hemodynamic criteria:

1. . Portal hypertension and/or liver disease (clinical diagnosis—ascites/varices/splenomegaly)
2. . Mean pulmonary artery pressure—MPAP > 20 mmHg at rest (revised from 25 to 20 according to 6th World Pulmonary Hypertension Symposium)
3. . Pulmonary vascular resistance—PVR > 240 dynes s cm−5
4. . Pulmonary artery occlusion pressure— PAOP < 15mmHg or transpulmonary gradient—TPG > 12 mmHg where TPG = MPAP − PAOP.

The diagnosis is usually first suggested by a transthoracic echocardiogram, part of the standard pre-transplantation work-up. Echocardiogram estimated pulmonary artery systolic pressures of 40 to 50 mm Hg are used as a screening cutoff for PPH diagnosis, with a sensitivity of 100% and a specificity as high as 96%. The negative predictive value of this method is 100% but the positive predictive value is 60%. Thereafter, these patients are referred for pulmonary artery catheterization.

The limitations of echocardiography are related to the derivative nature of non-invasive PAP estimation. The measurement of PAP by echocardiogram is made using a simplified Bernoulli equation. High cardiac index and pulmonary capillary wedge pressures, however, may lead to false positives by this standard. By one institution's evaluation, the correlation between estimated systolic PAP and directly measured PAP was poor, 0.49. For these reasons, right heart catheterization is needed to confirm the diagnosis.

== Treatment ==
In general, the treatment of PPH is derived from the treatment of pulmonary hypertension. The best treatment available is the combination of medical therapy and liver transplantation.

The ideal treatment for PPH management is that which can achieve pulmonary vasodilatation and smooth muscle relaxation without exacerbating systemic hypotension. Most of the therapies for PPH have been adapted from the primary pulmonary hypertension literature. Calcium channel blockers, beta blockers and nitrates have all been used – but the most potent and widely used aids are prostaglandin (and prostacyclin) analogs, phosphodiesterase inhibitors, nitric oxide and, most recently, endothelin receptor antagonists and agents capable of reversing the remodeling of pulmonary vasculature.

Inhaled nitric oxide vasodilates, decreasing pulmonary arterial pressure (PAP) and pulmonary vascular resistance (PVR) without affecting systemic artery pressure because it is rapidly inactivated by hemoglobin, and improves oxygenation by redistributing pulmonary blood flow to ventilated areas of lung. Inhaled nitric oxide has been used successfully to bridge patients through liver transplantation and the immediate perioperative period, but there are two significant drawbacks: it requires intubation and cannot be used for long periods of time due to methemoglobinemia.

Prostaglandin PGE1 (Alprostadil) binds G-protein linked cell surface receptors that activate adenylate cyclase to relax vascular smooth muscle. Prostacyclin – PGI2, an arachidonic acid derived lipid mediator (Epoprostenol, Flolan, Treprostenil) – is a vasodilator and, at the same time, the most potent inhibitor of platelet aggregation. More importantly, PGI2 (and not nitrous oxide) is also associated with an improvement in splanchnic perfusion and oxygenation. Epoprostenol and ilioprost (a more stable, longer acting variation) can and does successfully bridge for patients to transplant. Epoprostenol therapy can lower PAP by 29-46% and PVR by 21-71%., Ilioprost shows no evidence of generating tolerance, increases cardiac output and improves gas exchange while lowering PAP and PVR. A subset of patients does not respond to any therapy, likely having fixed vascular anatomic changes.

Phosphodiesterase inhibitors (PDE-i) have been employed with excellent results. It has been shown to reduce mean PAP by as much as 50%, though it prolongs bleeding time by inhibiting collagen-induced platelet aggregation. Another drug, milrinone, a type 3 PDE-i increases vascular smooth muscle adenosine-3,5-cyclic monophosphate concentrations to cause selective pulmonary vasodilation. Also, by causing the buildup of cAMP in the myocardium, milrinone increases contractile force, heart rate and the extent of relaxation.

The newest generation in PPH pharmacy shows great promise. Bosentan is a nonspecific endothelin-receptor antagonist capable of neutralizing the most identifiable cirrhosis associated vasoconstrictor, safely and efficaciously improving oxygenation and PVR, especially in conjunction with sildenafil. Finally, where the high pressures and pulmonary tree irritations of PPH cause a medial thickening of the vessels (smooth muscle migration and hyperplasia), one can remove the cause –control the pressure, transplant the liver – yet those morphological changes persist, sometimes necessitating lung transplantation. Imatinib, designed to treat chronic myeloid leukemia, has been shown to reverse the pulmonary remodeling associated with PPH.

== Prognosis ==
Following diagnosis, mean survival of patients with PPH is 15 months. The survival of those with cirrhosis is sharply curtailed by PPH but can be significantly extended by both medical therapy and liver transplantation, provided the patient remains eligible.

Eligibility for transplantation is generally related to mean pulmonary artery pressure (PAP). Given the fear that those PPH patients with high PAP will have right heart failure following the stress of post-transplant reperfusion or in the immediate perioperative period, patients are typically risk-stratified based on mean PAP. Indeed, the operation-related mortality rate is greater than 50% when pre-operative mean PAP values lie between 35 and 50 mm Hg; if mean PAP exceeds 40–45, transplantation is associated with a perioperative mortality of 70-80% (in those cases without preoperative medical therapy) Patients, then, are considered to have a high risk of perioperative death once their mean PAP exceeds 35 mmHg.

Survival is best inferred from published institutional experiences. At one institution, without treatment, 1-year survival was 46% and 5-year survival was 14%. With medical therapy, 1-year survival was 88% and 5-year survival was 55%. Survival at 5 years with medical therapy followed by liver transplantation was 67%. At another institution, of the 67 patients with PPH from 1652 total cirrhotics evaluated for transplant, half (34) were placed on the waiting list. Of these, 16 (48%) were transplanted at a time when 25% of all patients who underwent full evaluation received new livers, meaning the diagnosis of PPH made a patient twice as likely to be transplanted, once on the waiting list. Of those listed for transplant with PPH, 11 (33%) were eventually removed because of PPH, and 5 (15%) died on the waitlist. Of the 16 transplanted patients with PPH, 11 (69%) survived for more than a year after transplant, at a time when overall one-year survival in that center was 86.4%. The three-year post-transplant survival for patients with PPH was 62.5% when it was 81.02% overall at this institution.
