= Gallstone ileus =

- Other names: Biliary ileus
- Specialty: Gastroenterology

Gallstone ileus is a rare form of small bowel obstruction caused by an impaction of a gallstone within the lumen of the small intestine. Such a gallstone enters the bowel via a cholecysto-enteric fistula. The presence of large stones, >2.5 cm in diameter, within the gallbladder are thought to predispose to fistula formation by gradual erosion through the gallbladder fundus. Once a fistula has formed, a stone may travel from the gallbladder into the bowel and become lodged almost anywhere along the gastrointestinal tract. Obstruction occurs most commonly at the near the distal ileum, within 60 cm proximally to the ileocecal valve. Rarely, gallstone ileus may recur if the underlying fistula is not treated.

First described by Thomas Bartholin in 1654, the name "gallstone ileus" is a misnomer because an ileus is, by definition, a non-mechanical bowel motility failure (as opposed to a mechanical obstruction by a stone).

== Diagnosis ==
Diagnosis of gallstone ileus requires radiographic studies. Classic radiographic findings are known as Rigler's triad:

- pneumobilia (air within the biliary tree)
- evidence of small bowel obstruction
- radiopaque gallstone on abdominal radiograph

== Treatment ==
Initial management involves fluid resuscitation and potentially nasogastric suctioning. Since gallstone ileus constitutes a form of mechanical small bowel obstruction, it can be a surgical emergency and requires open or laparoscopic surgery to remove an impacted stone. The different strategies for surgical management are either enterolithotomy alone, allowing a delayed cholecystectomy after an inflammation-free period of 4–6 weeks (and therefore two-stage surgery) or enterolithotomy in combination with a cholecystectomy and fistula division (one-stage surgery). The different strategies for surgical management are controversial, and depend on factors such as patient fitness for surgery and comorbidities.

== Eponym ==
Bouveret's syndrome refers to reverse gallstone ileus where the gallstone propagates proximally and causes gastric outlet obstruction by being impacted in first part of duodenum.
