= Megacolon =

Abnormal dilation of the large intestine

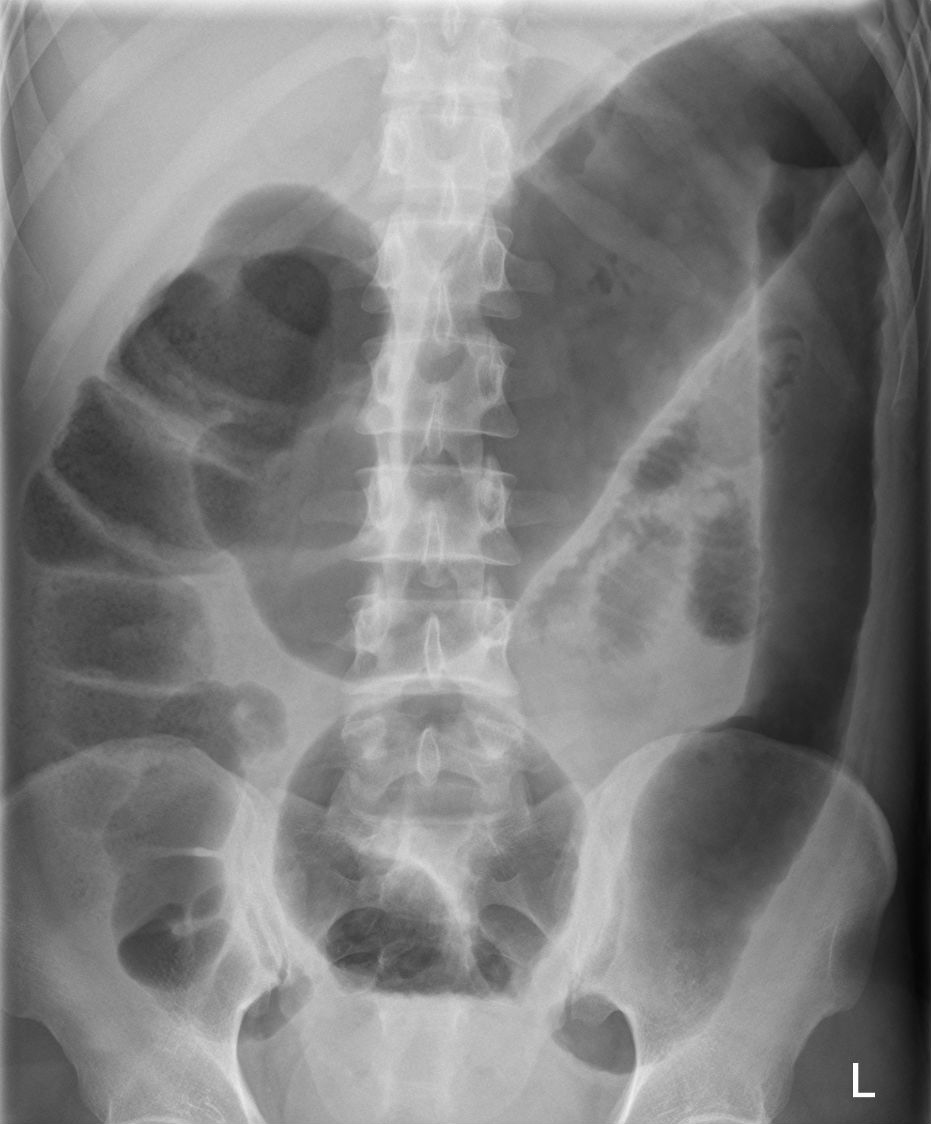
- Toxic megacolon associated with ulcerative colitis.
- Specialty: Gastroenterology

Megacolon is an abnormal dilation of the colon (also called the large intestine). This leads to hypertrophy of the colon. The dilation is often accompanied by a paralysis of the peristaltic movements of the bowel. In more extreme cases, the feces consolidate into hard masses inside the colon, called fecalomas, which can require surgery to be removed.

A human colon is considered abnormally enlarged if it has a diameter greater than 12 cm (4.7 in) in the cecum (it is usually less than 9 cm [3.5 in]), greater than 6.5 cm (2.6 in) in the rectosigmoid region and greater than 8 cm (3.1 in) for the ascending colon. The transverse colon is usually less than 6 cm (2.4 in) in diameter.

A megacolon can be either acute or chronic. It can also be classified according to cause.

== Signs and symptoms ==
External signs and symptoms are constipation of very long duration, abdominal bloating, abdominal tenderness and tympany, abdominal pain, palpation of hard fecal masses and, in toxic megacolon, fever, low blood potassium, tachycardia and may lead to shock. Stercoral ulcers are sometimes observed in chronic megacolon, which may lead to perforation of the intestinal wall in approximately 3% of the cases, leading to sepsis and risk of death.

== Causes ==
- Congenital or aganglionic megacolon
- Medication
  - Risperidone, an anti-psychotic medication, can result in megacolon.
- Acquired megacolon, of which there are several possible causes:
  - Idiopathic megacolon
  - Toxic megacolon
  - Megacolon secondary to infection
    - Clostridioides difficile infection
    - Trypanosoma cruzi (Chagas disease)
  - Pheochromocytoma, possibly secondary to its presenting constipation.
  - Other neurologic, systemic, and metabolic diseases

=== Aganglionic megacolon ===
Also called Hirschsprung's disease, it is a congenital disorder of the colon in which nerve cells of the myenteric plexus in its walls, also known as ganglion cells, are absent. It is a rare disorder (1:5000), with prevalence among males being four times that of females. Hirschsprung's disease develops in the fetus during the early stages of pregnancy. A genetic predisposition to Hirschsprung's disease has been linked to chromosome 13 where a missense mutation at an ultraconserved region impairs functionality of the W276C receptor. Seven other genes seem to be implicated, however. If untreated, the patient can develop enterocolitis.

=== Toxic megacolon ===
Toxic megacolon is mainly seen in ulcerative colitis and pseudomembranous colitis, two chronic inflammations of the colon (and occasionally, in the other type of inflammatory bowel disease, Crohn's disease). Its mechanism is incompletely understood. It is probably due to excessive production of nitric oxide, at least in ulcerative colitis. The prevalence is about the same for both sexes.

In patients with HIV/AIDS, cytomegalovirus (CMV) colitis is the leading cause of toxic megacolon and emergency laparotomy. CMV may also increase the risk of toxic megacolon in non-HIV/AIDS patients with IBD.

=== Chagas disease ===
Megacolon can be associated with Chagas disease. Chagas disease is caused by Trypanosoma cruzi, a flagellate protozoan transmitted by the assassin bug. Chagas disease can also be acquired congenitally, through blood transfusion or organ transplant, and rarely through contaminated food (for example, garapa). There are several theories on how megacolon (and also megaesophagus) develops in Chagas disease. The Austrian-Brazilian physician and pathologist Fritz Köberle was the first to propose the neurogenic hypothesis based on the documented destruction of the myenteric plexus in the walls of the intestinal tracts of Chagas patients. In this, the destruction of the autonomic nervous system innervation of the colon leads to a loss of the normal smooth muscle tone of the wall and subsequent gradual dilation. His research proved that, by extensively quantifying the number of neurons of the autonomic nervous system in the Auerbach's plexus, that:

1. Neurons were strongly reduced all over the digestive tract;
2. megacolon appeared only when there was a reduction of over 80% of the number of neurons
3. These pathologies appeared as a result of the disruption of the neurally integrated control of peristalsis (muscular annular contraction) in those parts where a strong force is necessary to impel the luminal bolus of feces
4. Idiopathic megacolon and Chagas megacolon appear to have the same cause, namely, the degeneration of the myenteric plexus.

Why T. cruzi causes the destruction remains to be determined. There is evidence for the presence of specific neurotoxins as well as a disorderly immune system reaction.

== Diagnosis ==
Diagnosis is achieved mainly by plain and contrasted radiographical and ultrasound imaging. Colonic marker transit studies are useful to distinguish colonic inertia from functional outlet obstruction causes. In this test, the patient swallows a water-soluble bolus of radiocontrast agent and films are obtained 1, 3, and 5 days later. Patients with colonic inertia show the marker spread throughout the large intestines, while patients with outlet obstruction exhibit slow accumulations of markers in some places. A colonoscopy can also be used to rule out mechanical obstructive causes. Anorectal manometry may help to differentiate acquired from congenital forms. Rectal biopsy is recommended to make a final diagnosis of Hirschsprung disease.

== Treatment ==
Possible treatments include:

- Stable cases are effectively treated with laxatives and bulking agents, as well as modifications in diet and stool habits.
- Corticosteroids and other anti-inflammatory medications are used in toxic megacolon.
- Antibiotics are used for bacterial infections such as oral vancomycin for Clostridioides difficile
- Disimpaction of feces and decompression using anorectal and nasogastric tubes are used to treat megacolon.
- When megacolon worsens and the conservative measures fail to restore transit, surgery may be necessary.
- Bethanechol can also be used to treat megacolon through its direct cholinergic action and its stimulation of muscarinic receptors, which bring about a parasympathetic-like effect.

There are several surgical approaches to treat megacolon, such as a colectomy (removal of the entire colon) with ileorectal anastomosis (ligation of the remaining ileum and rectum segments), or a total proctocolectomy (removal of colon, sigmoid and rectum) followed by ileostomy or followed by ileoanal anastomosis.

== See also ==
- Dolichocolon
