= Congestive hepatopathy =

- Other names: Nutmeg liver and Chronic passive congestion of the liver
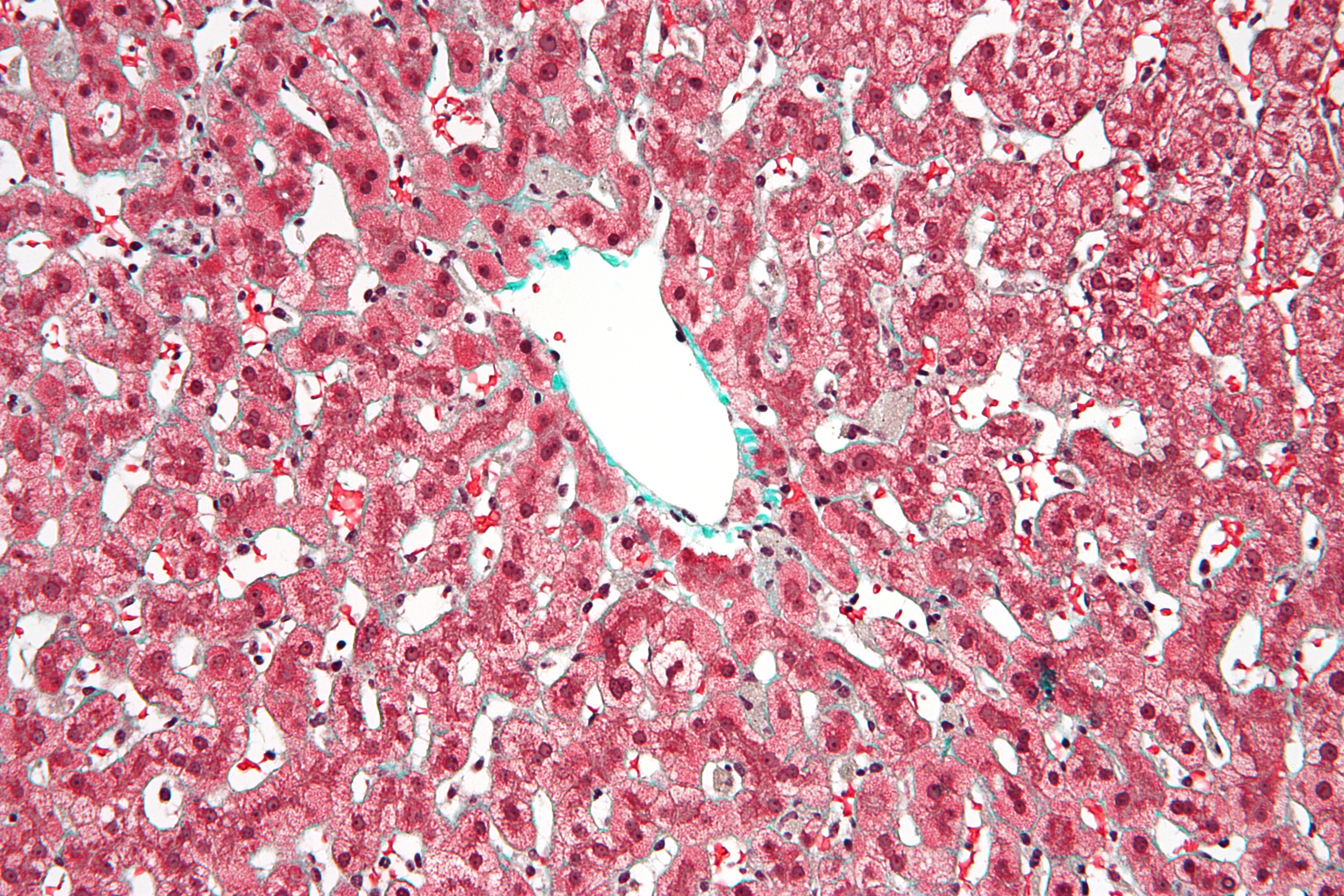
- Micrograph of congestive hepatopathy demonstrating perisinusoidal fibrosis and centrilobular (zone III) sinusoidal dilation. Liver biopsy. Trichrome stain.
- Specialty: Gastroenterology, hepatology

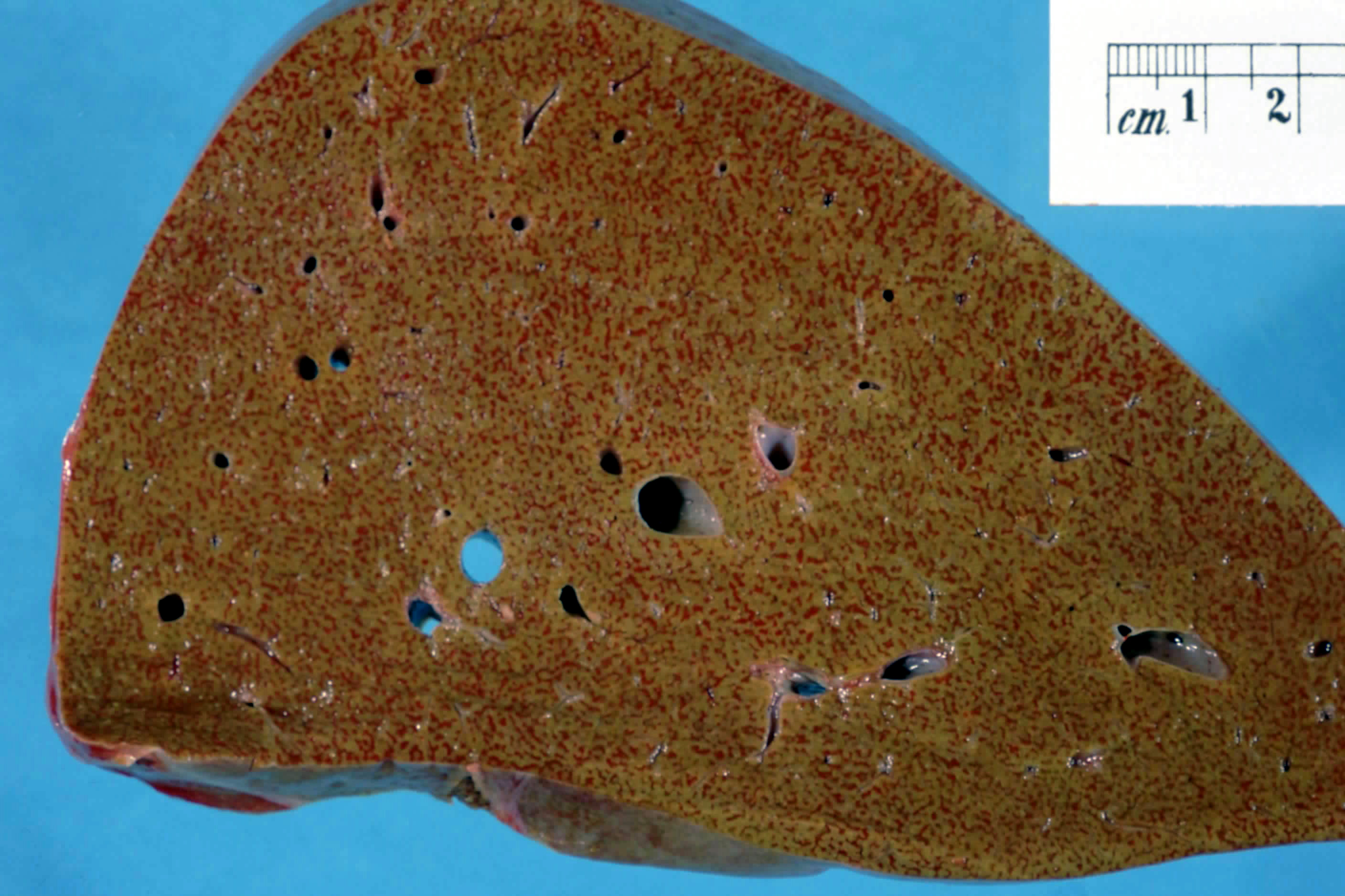
Liver showing chronic passive congestion associated with tricuspid valve incompetence. So called 'nutmeg liver',

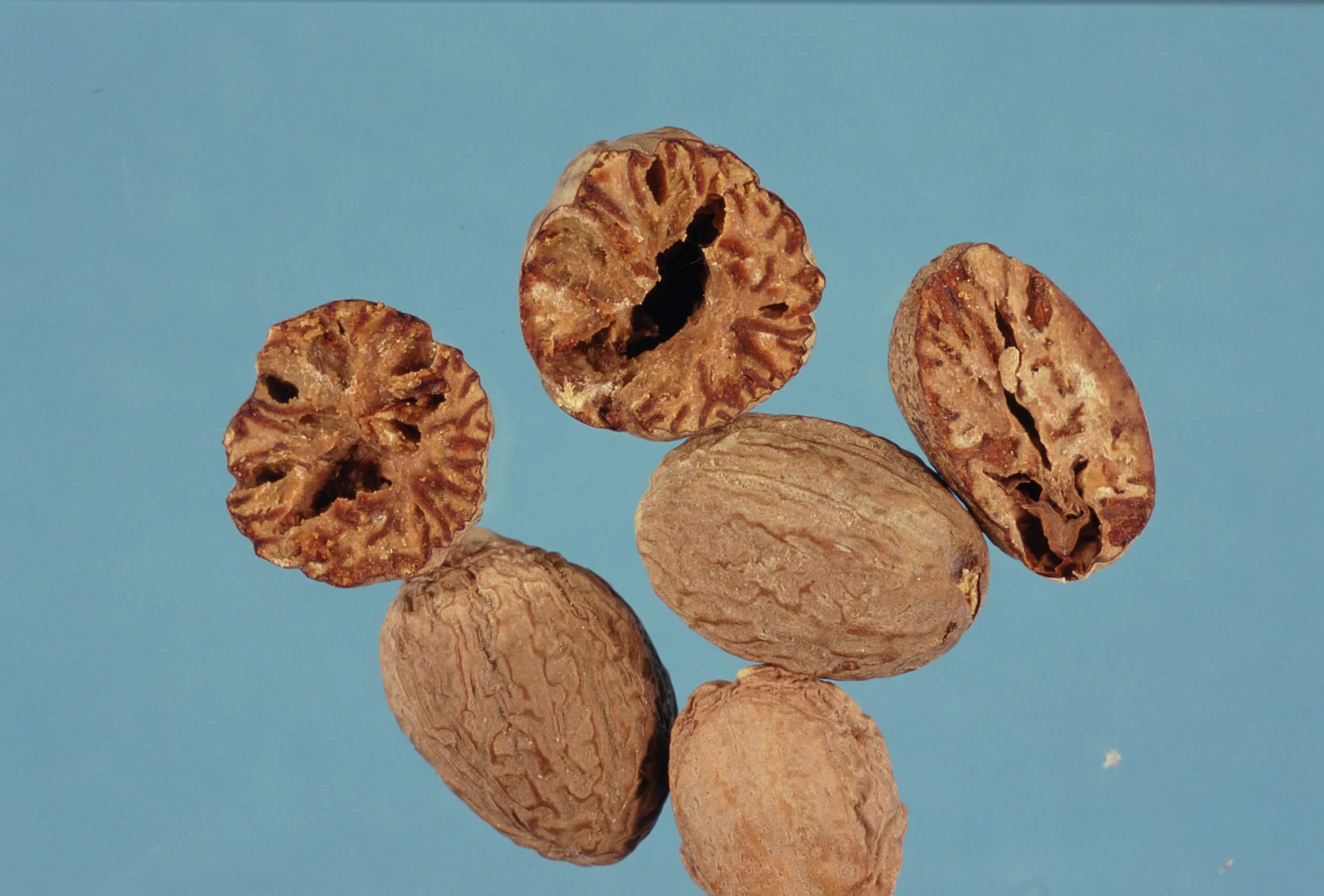
Split nutmeg, for those who have never seen this appearance.

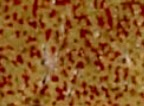
Close up of congested liver showing the 'nutmeg' appearance

Congestive hepatopathy is liver dysfunction due to venous congestion, usually due to congestive heart failure. The gross pathological appearance of a liver affected by chronic passive congestion is "speckled" like a grated nutmeg kernel; the dark spots represent the dilated and congested hepatic venules and small hepatic veins. The paler areas are unaffected surrounding liver tissue. When severe and longstanding, hepatic congestion can lead to fibrosis; if congestion is due to right heart failure, it is called cardiac cirrhosis.

== Signs and symptoms ==
Signs and symptoms depend largely upon the primary lesions giving rise to the condition. In addition to the heart or lung symptoms, there will be a sense of fullness and tenderness in the right hypochondriac region. Gastrointestinal catarrh is usually present, and vomiting of blood may occur. There is usually more or less jaundice. Owing to portal obstruction, ascites occurs, followed later by generalised oedema. The stools are light or clay-colored, and the urine is colored by bile. On palpation, the liver is found enlarged and tender, sometimes extending several inches below the costal margin of the ribs.

== Pathophysiology ==
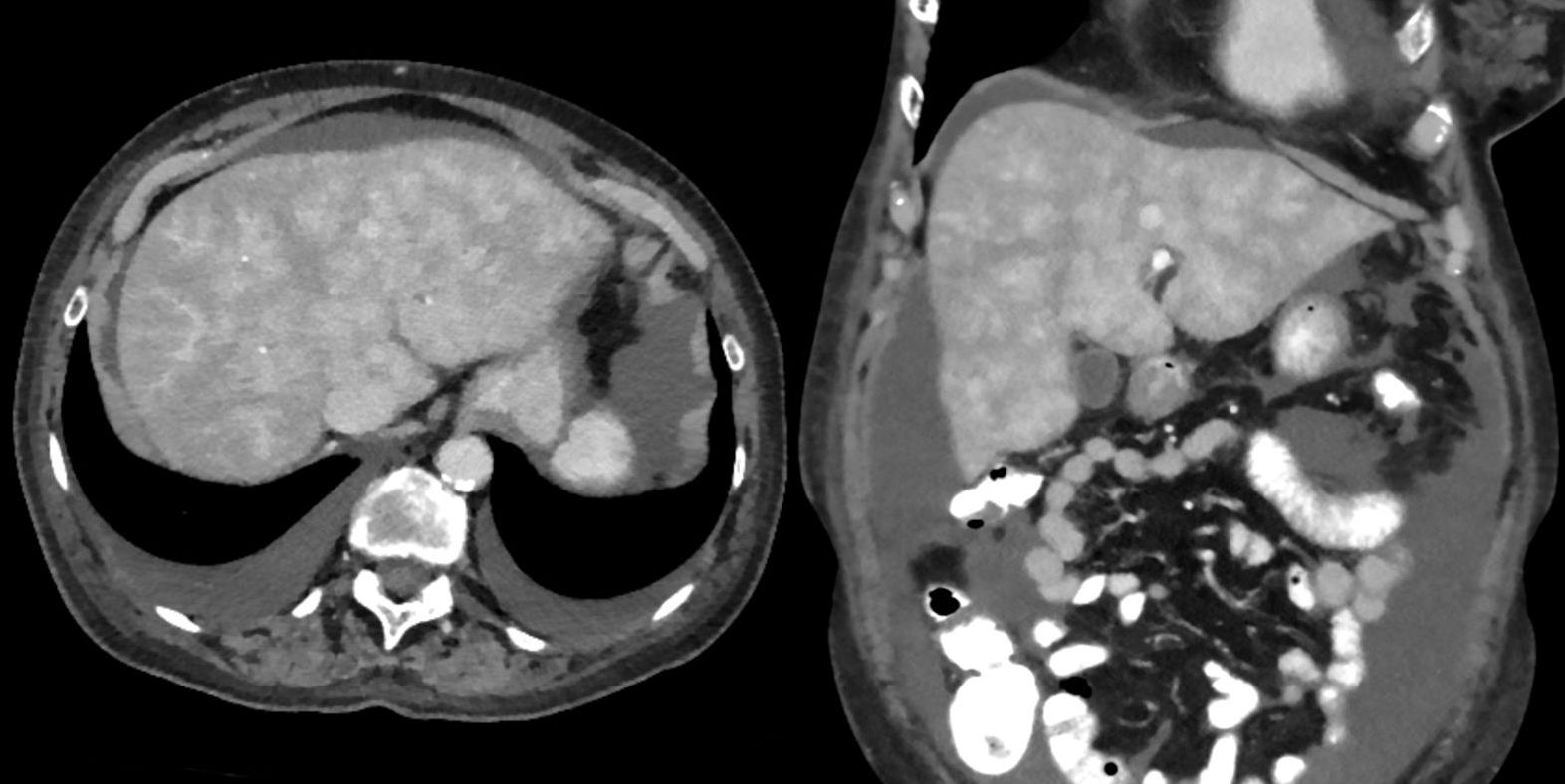
CT appearance of liver in congestive hepatopathy, sometimes referred to as a nutmeg liver. Due to congestion, contrast does not flow through the liver in a normal manner. Axial and coronal images in the portal venous phase.

Increased pressure in the sublobular branches of the hepatic veins causes an engorgement of venous blood, and is most frequently due to chronic cardiac lesions, especially those affecting the right heart (e.g., right-sided heart failure), the blood being dammed back in the inferior vena cava and hepatic veins. Central regions of the hepatic lobules are red–brown and stand out against the non-congested, tan-coloured liver. Centrilobular necrosis occurs.

Macroscopically, the liver has a pale and spotty appearance in affected areas, as stasis of the blood causes pericentral hepatocytes (liver cells surrounding the central venule of the liver) to become deoxygenated compared to the relatively better-oxygenated periportal hepatocytes adjacent to the hepatic arterioles. This retardation of the blood also occurs in lung lesions, such as chronic interstitial pneumonia, pleural effusions, and intrathoracic tumors.

== Diagnosis ==
It is diagnosed with laboratory testing, including liver function tests, and radiology imaging, including ultrasounds. Imaging findings include enlarged hepatic veins and inferior venacava, with reflux of intravenous contrast from the right atrium to the inferior venacava and hepatic veins. The liver is typically enlarged and demonstrates mottled enhancement (nutmeg liver). Ascites is usually present and can be detected in imaging.

== Treatment ==
Treatment is directed largely to removing the cause, or, where that is impossible, to modifying effects of the heart failure. Thus, therapy aimed at improving right heart function will also improve congestive hepatopathy. True nutmeg liver is usually secondary to left-sided heart failure, causing congestive right heart failure, so treatment options are limited.

Treatments for heart failure include medications, an intra-aortic balloon pump, a ventricular assist device, heart valve replacements, extracorporeal membrane oxygenation (if the heart failure worsens suddenly and especially if an infection was the cause), an artificial heart, or a heart transplant (from a deceased human donor, or from a pig). Some patients may need a liver transplant; an artificial liver can be used for a short period of time (about two weeks or so) as a bridge to a transplant, or until the liver recovers.

== See also ==
- Ischemic hepatitis
