= Ileosigmoid knot =

- Specialty: Gastroenterology

An ileosigmoid knot or compound volvulus is an uncommon cause of intestinal blockage. The condition arises when ileum loops wrap around the bottom of a redundant sigmoid loop. In some countries in Africa, Asia, and the Middle East, the ileosigmoid knot is a well-known ailment; this condition is uncommon in the West.

== Signs and symptoms ==
Ileosigmoid knotting typically manifests as sudden, severe abdominal pain. It can quickly worsen into sigmoid colon and ileum gangrene, which can lead to potentially fatal side effects like sepsis, generalized peritonitis, electrolyte imbalance, and dehydration. Abdominal pain and tenderness (100%) and distension of the abdomen (94%–100%), vomiting and nausea (87–100%), rebound tenderness (69%), as well as shock (0–60%) are the main symptoms and presentation indicators.

== Causes ==
The ileosigmoid knot is caused by three things: eating a high-bulk diet while the small bowel is empty; having a long, sigmoid colon on a tiny pedicle; and having a long, mesentery, and freely moving small bowel. The intestines become more mobile when a semi-liquid, heavy meal moves into the proximal jejunum, and the heavier sections of the jejunum fall to the left lower quadrant. Around the base of the narrow sigmoid colon, the empty loops of the ileum and distal jejunum rotate in a clockwise direction. With two closed-loop obstructions—one in the small bowel and the other in the sigmoid colon—further peristalsis creates an ileosigmoid knot.

== Diagnosis ==
Even though radiographic findings indicate colonic obstruction, which is uncommon in small bowel obstruction, clinical features like vomiting point to small bowel obstruction. Ileosigmoid knotting is frequently confused radiographically with a straightforward sigmoid volvulus. On the other hand, in contrast to sigmoid volvulus, attempts to deflate the enlarged colon with a flatus tube or sigmoidoscope frequently fail and may even be hazardous in ileosigmoid knotting. This is because the ileum firmly encloses the sigmoid colon's base, thwarting any such attempt. These three characteristics—the inability to insert a sigmoidoscope, radiographic evidence of primarily large bowel obstruction, and the clinical picture of small bowel obstruction—might make up a helpful diagnostic triad.

Due to their unfamiliarity, the radiographic findings of ileosigmoid knotting—which include multiple air-fluid levels in the small intestine and a double loop of dilated sigmoid shadow—are only occasionally described.

The descending colon, medial deviation of the cecum, and "the whirl sign," which is produced by the twisted intestinal tract and sigmoid mesocolon in ileosigmoid knot, are findings in a CT scan that are suggestive of ileosigmoid knotting. Furthermore, some have observed the radial distribution of the mesenteric vasculature and the intestine and believe this to be useful diagnostic data.

=== Classification ===
Ileosigmoid knotting has been classified into the three types listed below:

Type 1: The ileum, which is the active component, encircles the sigmoid colon, which is the passive component, either clockwise or counterclockwise (type A when clockwise and type B when counterclockwise).

Type 2: In either a clockwise or counterclockwise direction, the sigmoid colon, the active component, encircles an ileum loop, the passive component.

Type 3: The sigmoid colon (passive component) is encircled by the ileocecal segment (active component).

== Treatment ==
Aggressive resuscitation with fluid and electrolytes, along with the correction of any acid-base imbalance, are the initial management measures. The earliest possible surgical intervention should be performed following hemodynamic stabilization. After the procedure, appropriate antibiotic therapy is started as soon as possible and is continued for 5-7 days. Metronidazole, aminoglycosides, and cephalosporins are the typical antibiotic combinations.

== Epidemiology ==
Males account for 80.2% of cases of ileosigmoid knotting, with a mean age of 40 years (range: 4-90 years). The literature indicates the presence of additional secondary causative factors in addition to the aforementioned anatomic prerequisites, such as late pregnancy, Meckel's diverticulitis with a band, trans mesenteric herniation, floating cecum, and ileocecal intussusceptions.

Ileosigmoid knotting is uncommon in the white population, although it is primarily documented in some African, Asian, and Middle Eastern countries.

== History ==
E Parker is credited with describing the first case of ileosigmoid knotting in 1846.

== See also ==
- Volvulus
- Bowel obstruction
