= Coffee bean sign =

Pattern seen during radiologic examination

- Abdominal X-ray demonstrating a classic 'coffee bean sign,' with massively dilated loops of bowel.

The coffee bean sign (also called the kidney bean sign, or bent inner tube sign) is a radiologic sign observed on abdominal radiographs that specified the presence of a sigmoid volvulus, a form of bowel obstruction. It can be identified on both abdominal x-rays and abdominal computed tomography scans. It is seen as an area of hyperlucency resembling a coffee bean and represents the torsion of the sigmoid colon around the mesentery. The opposed walls of adjacent bowel loops form the central cleft while the two sides of the bean represent gas‐filled segments of dilated bowel that form an inverted U‐shape. Physicians must be aware of this sign as it indicates the possible need for emergent medical intervention as sigmoid volvulus can be a life-threatening condition.

== Methods of detection ==
Up to 80% of cases of sigmoid volvulus can be identified through plain abdominal radiographs of patients taken in the supine position. The pathognomonic radiographic finding of a coffee bean sign can appear in 57-90% of cases on x-ray. However, if the initial radiograph does not decisively diagnose the volvulus, the work-up may be supplemented with the use of abdominal computed tomography (CT) scans and/or a single-contrast barium enema. An abdominal CT scan can provide additional diagnostic confirmation via the identification of the whirl sign and a dilated colon with air-fluid levels. While not always necessary, it does ensure an accurate diagnosis. If a barium enema is performed, it would reveal an abrupt stop of the barium contrast at the site of the colon torsion. This procedure carries risks, including perforation or worsening of the obstruction, and should be avoided in cases where bowel ischemia or perforation is suspected.

== Radiological appearance ==
On abdominal radiographs, the sigmoid volvulus appears as a large, air-filled loop of the sigmoid colon that is in a distinctive upside-down U-shape. The two curved sides of the bean shows the bowel segments which are being dilated by gas, while the central rift corresponds to the bowel segments that are overlapping and being compressed on each other at the site of the twist. Air-fluid levels may also be identified within the dilated bowel loops on upright or decubitus abdominal radiographs. In severe cases, the presence of air within the bowel wall (parietal pneumatosis) indicates potential bowel ischemia, while free air notes in the peritoneal cavity raises concern for a bowel perforation.

Abdominal CT scans can provide additional diagnostic information such as the whirl sign which is pathognomonic for a volvulus. On CT, the whirl sign appears as a central soft-tissue density at the site of the torsion of the bowel and the mesentery. Its appearance represents the twisted part of the colon which is circled by the adjacent mesenteric blood vessels and fat. The top of the coffee bean shape can be as high as the 10th thoracic vertebrae and often take up the entire abdomen. These radiographic images may also guide clinicians in determining whether or not there are potential complications such as ischemia or perforation.

== Clinical relevance ==
Clinicians should recognize this sign as an indication of a potentially serious condition and promptly assess the need for emergency treatment, as sigmoid volvulus can be life-threatening.

=== Risk factors ===
Several factors can increase the likelihood of a coffee bean sign presenting on radiographs. One major contributor is chronic constipation, which can lead to persistent/recurrent bowel distention and make the sigmoid colon more vulnerable to twisting. Other predisposing factors include neurologic conditions, megacolon, structural abnormalities, and history of prior abdominal surgery, all of which can alter normal intestinal movement.

=== Symptoms and physical exam findings ===
The most common complaints of patients with sigmoid volvulus are abdominal distention, constipation, abdominal pain/cramps, with these symptoms often developing gradually. Other individuals may also experience nausea, vomiting, diarrhea, and loss of appetite due to blockage. While discomfort is common, severe pain is unusual unless complications such as bowel ischemia or perforation have also occurred.

When a physician performs their physical examinations of the patient they will often find the abdomen to be distended and tender when pressed on, with bowel sounds that may be reduced or even absent depending on the severity of the obstruction. The abdomen can also be noted to be tympanic sounding due to trapped gas in the bowel loops. If the bowel becomes ischemic or perforates, patient will showcase signs of peritoneal irritation, such as guarding and rebound tenderness. Volvulus cannot be diagnosed solely with clinical findings but often raise suspicion and prompt the need for further imaging.

=== Management implications ===
The initial approach to management depends on the patient's clinical stability and the presence of complications. In stable patients without signs of bowel ischemia or perforation, endoscopic decompression using a flexible sigmoidoscope or rigid proctoscope is the preferred first-line treatment, as it allows for direct visualization and immediate reduction of the volvulus. Successful decompression is confirmed by the evacuation of gas and liquid per rectum, leading to a rapid reduction in abdominal distention, which can be further documented via repeat imaging. However, recurrence is common, affecting up to two-thirds of patients, making elective sigmoid resection the preferred long-term solution for low-risk surgical candidates. If decompression fails or complications like ischemia, perforation, or peritonitis arise, emergency surgery with sigmoid colectomy is necessary.

=== Differential diagnoses ===
This classic radiological sign can be mimicked by conditions that cause dilation in the large bowels, such as cecal volvulus, toxic megacolon, severe constipation, or fecal impaction. Other conditions to consider as they can present with symptoms and physical exam findings of sigmoid volvulus include abdominal aortic aneurysm, bowel obstruction, bowel perforation, appendicitis, and mesenteric ischemia.
