= Distension =

Distension (spelled distention in many style regimens) generally refers to an enlargement, dilation, or ballooning effect. It may refer to:

- Abdominal distension, typically a symptom of an underlying disease or dysfunction in the body, rather than an illness in its own right
- Gastric distension, bloating of the stomach when air is pumped into it, as in a medical procedure
- Distention of blood vessels under increased blood pressure; see Compliance (physiology) § Blood vessels
