= Sigmoid colon volvulus =

- Other names: Sigmoid volvulus
- Specialty: General surgery, gastroenterology, emergency medicine

Sigmoid colon volvulus, also known as sigmoid volvulus, is volvulus affecting the sigmoid colon. It is a common cause of bowel obstruction and constipation. It is common in Asia, India (7% of intestinal obstruction) and especially South India because of the high fibre diet. It is a very common cause of large bowel obstruction in Peru and Bolivia due to high altitude.

== Signs and symptoms ==
- Pain in abdomen – initially left-sided, eventually all over
- Absolute constipation
- Enormous distension of abdomen
- Late vomiting and eventually dehydration
- Features of peritonitis
- Hiccup and retching may occur
- Tyre-like feel of the abdomen is diagnostic

== Cause ==
The condition is more common in males and with old age. It is also common in people with chronic constipation and laxative abuse.

It is common in:

- Ogilvie syndrome
- Individuals with learning difficulties
- Chagas disease
- Hypothyroidism
- Anticholinergic drugs
- Multiple sclerosis
- Scleroderma
- Parkinson's disease

In sigmoid, volvulus rotation is always anticlockwise. It requires one and a half rotation to cause vascular obstruction and gangrene which eventually leads to perforation either at the root or at the summit of the sigmoid loop.

== Diagnosis ==
1. Plain X-ray (diagnostic in 70–80%): coffee bean sign is seen
2. Contrast enema: bird beak sign
3. CT scan: shows characteristic whirl pattern
4. Blood: haematocrit, renal functions, serum electrolytes

== Treatment ==
- RT aspiration
- IV fluids
- Catheterisation
- Antibiotics
- By flatus tube or sigmoidoscope, derotation is done
- If derotation does not occur, then laparotomy through midline incision should be done. It is derotated manually. If viable, it can be fixed to lateral wall of abdomen or pelvis
- If sigmoid colon is gangrenous, then Hartmann's operation or Paul Mikulicz operation is done
