= Julia Reagan =

American woman (1942–2024)

- An example of a Julia Reagan billboard
- Born: Julia Louise Dolowitz; October 30, 1942; Baltimore, Maryland, US
- Died: June 12, 2024 (aged 81); Salt Lake City, Utah, US
- Education: Mills College; University of Utah
- Known for: Appearing on billboards posthumously
- Spouse: William "Bill" Reagan (m. 1965)
- Children: 4

Julia Louise Dolowitz Reagan (October 30 1942–June 12, 2024; née Dolowitz) was an American woman known for posthumously appearing on over 300 billboards, primarily in Salt Lake City.

== Life ==
Julia Reagan was born Julia Dolowitz on October 30, 1942 to Frances and David Dolowtiz in Baltimore, Maryland. She attended Olympus High School, Mills College, and earned a Ph.D. from the University of Utah.

Reagan met her husband, William "Bill" Reagan at a party on November 27, 1965. After their fifth date, on December 25, they began driving from Hotel Utah in Salt Lake City to San Francisco, California on a whim. They had a courthouse marriage the next morning, on December 26 in Reno, Nevada. On December 29, 1965, they returned to Utah and had a second wedding with a rabbi as arranged by Julia's father.

Julia was a humanitarian, regularly making donations to community non-profits. She served on the boards of Valley Mental Health, the Rape Recovery Center, Foster Care Review, and the Children's Center.

Julia had four children, one of whom predeceased her, and ten grandchildren.

== Death ==
On June 8, 2024, Julia returned from a regular health checkup at a Mayo Clinic in Rochester, Minnesota, who said she was in good health. On June 10, Julia experienced dehydration and drowsiness. Bill called an EMT, who said Julia was stable and did not need to visit the hospital. On June 11, after she vomited twice, Bill called Julia an ambulance, taking her to the University of Utah Hospital, where she was admitted in the morning of June 12. A CT scan revealed fluid in a distended stomach and a hiatal hernia. A few hours later, Julia experienced severe vomiting, causing injury to her lungs and brain. She died that day of cardiac arrest.

An autopsy showed she died of sudden cardiac arrest caused by aspiration of vomit triggered by a small bowel obstuction due to abdominal adhesions.

On February 21, 2025, Bill filed a lawsuit against Univeristy of Utah Hospitals and Clinics and five Does for negligence leading to wrongful death.

== Legacy ==
Bill Reagan is the founder and owner of Reagan Outdoor Advertising, the largest billboard company in Utah which operates over 9000 billboards across the United States. Shortly after Julia's death, he had 360 billboards featuring a memorial of her put up; 60 in Salt Lake City, and the other 300 nationwide. The billboards went viral online, in part because of the brat summer trend, with netizens associating the 360 billboards with the song "360" by Charli XCX, and, more specifically, the lyric "I'm so Julia". In 2025, the billboards received new designs. The billboards remained up until the beginning of June of 2025, when, on June 15, they began being removed. In May 2026, the billboards began reappearing around Salt Lake City and ran through mid-June, a tradition Bill intends to keep alive every year. On July 24, 2026, Julia became the subject of one of the inaugural exhibits at the Salt Lake Art Museum.
