= Chronic intestinal pseudo-obstruction =

- Other names: CIPO
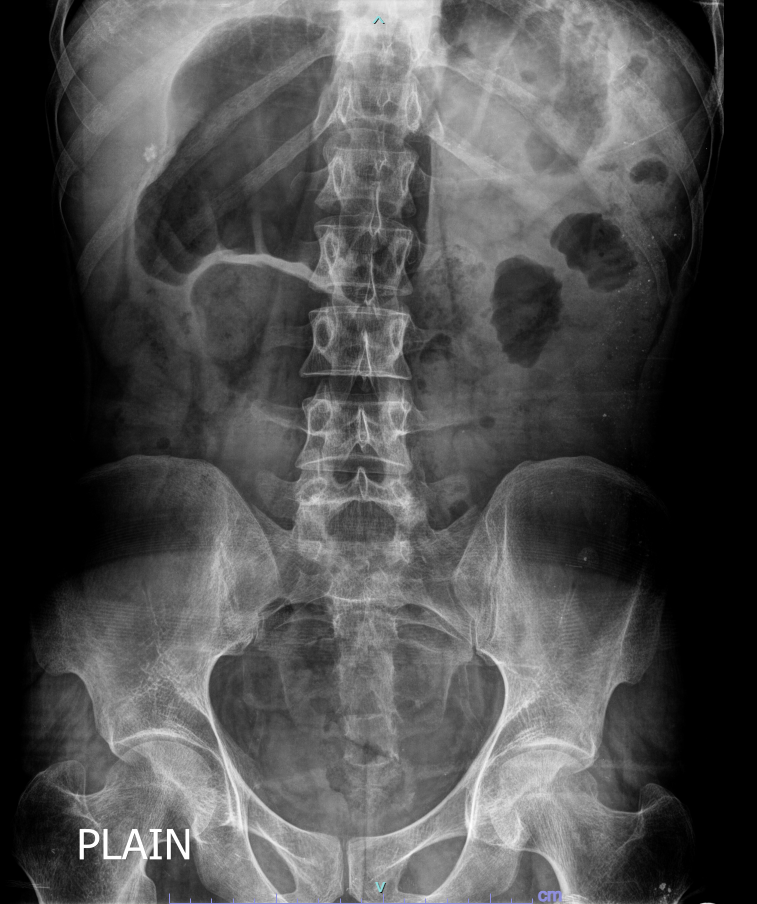
- X-ray showing distended stomach and bowel loops. Dilated bowel loops are a characteristic of chronic intestinal pseudo-obstruction.
- Specialty: Gastroenterology
- Symptoms: Abdominal pain, bloating, and distension.
- Duration: Chronic.
- Causes: Neurologic, paraneoplastic, autoimmune, metabolic/endocrine, genetic, or infectious diseases.
- Diagnostic method: Clinical features and exclusion of mechanical obstruction.
- Treatment: Dietary modification and management of symptoms.
- Frequency: 0.80 to 1.00 per 100,000.

Chronic intestinal pseudo-obstruction (CIPO) is a very rare syndrome with chronic and recurrent symptoms that suggest intestinal obstruction in the absence of any mechanical blockage of the lumen. The most common symptoms of CIPO include abdominal pain, constipation, nausea, vomiting, dysphagia, and abdominal distention. CIPO can lead to malnutrition.

Chronic intestinal pseudo-obstruction can be caused by a variety of other disorders or it can be idiopathic. Certain genetic disorders can also cause CIPO. Mechanisms behind CIPO include abnormalities in the smooth muscle cells, interstitial cells of Cajal (ICCs), and intrinsic and extrinsic neurons.

The diagnosis of CIPO is made based on clinical symptoms and radiographic studies. Abdominal X-rays, CT scans, endoscopies, laboratory tests, and biopsies may be used to make the diagnosis of CIPO. Treatment involves ensuring adequate nutrition and managing the symptoms of CIPO. Enteral or parenteral nutrition may be needed to maintain proper nutrition. Analgesics, antiemetics, antisecretory, antispasmodics, prokinetic agents, laxatives, or antidiarrheal medications may be used to help manage the symptoms of CIPO. The long-term prognosis for CIPO is poor. Patients often require parenteral nutrition due to their symptoms. The mortality rate for pediatric CIPO patients ranges from 10-25% before adulthood.

"Intestinal pseudo-obstruction" is a broad term that refers to any paralysis of the intestines that is not caused by a mechanical obstruction. Ogilvie syndrome is an acute form of intestinal pseudo-obstruction.

== Signs and symptoms ==
Symptoms of chronic intestinal pseudo-obstruction can vary depending on which segment of the gastrointestinal tract is most involved and may evolve as the disease progresses. Patients may experience varying degrees of symptoms or be asymptomatic in between sub-occlusive episodes. Chronic intestinal pseudo-obstruction typically develops gradually over years, with gastrointestinal symptoms of increasing severity sometimes occurring years before the first sub-occlusive episode; less frequently, the onset occurs suddenly, with the patient presenting with a sub-occlusive episode.

Patients with chronic intestinal pseudo-obstruction that involves the small bowel commonly present with symptoms such as constipation, abdominal pain, nausea, and vomiting. Diarrhea may result from bacterial overgrowth brought on by small bowel dysmotility-induced stasis.

In patients with primarily gastric involvement, postprandial bloating, early satiety, pain in the abdomen, nausea, and vomiting may be present along with significant gastroparesis.

Dysphagia or symptoms of gastroesophageal reflux disease are seen in patients with esophageal involvement, while abdominal distension and constipation are signs of colonic involvement.

=== Complications ===
Patients with chronic intestinal pseudo-obstruction often experience debilitating symptoms that result in nutrition compromise as well as the need for central parenteral nutrition. According to estimates, between 30% and 50% of adult patients with chronic intestinal pseudo-obstruction will eventually need parenteral nutrition, and up to two-thirds of patients experience some form of nutritional deficiency.

== Causes ==
Pseudo-obstruction in adults is a rare disorder that can have primary or secondary causes. Adult pseudo-obstruction's most frequent secondary causes include radiation enteritis, amyloidosis, paraneoplastic syndromes, hypothyroidism, usage of substances with anticholinergic or narcotic effects, diabetes, scleroderma, and other connective tissue disorders.

Recently, viral infections such as Epstein-Barr virus, Herpes Zoster, and Cytomegalovirus have drawn attention as potential causes of pseudo-obstruction.

It's been demonstrated that pseudo-obstruction is caused by mitochondrial diseases. An occult neoplasm may be the target of an immune response resulting in severe intestinal dysmotility. Of all the cancers linked to pseudo-obstruction, small-cell lung carcinoma is the most prevalent.

However, in many cases, the symptoms of pseudoobstruction have no known cause; these patients are diagnosed with chronic idiopathic intestinal pseudo-obstruction.

=== Genetics ===
There have also been reports of uncommon familial chronic intestinal pseudo-obstruction forms. There have been reports of X-linked, autosomal recessive, and syndromic autosomal dominant forms of chronic intestinal pseudo-obstruction. The Xq28 region has been mapped to an X-linked locus.

== Mechanism ==
Abnormalities in the gastrointestinal control systems, including smooth muscle cells, interstitial cells of Cajal (ICCs), and intrinsic and extrinsic neurons, can all contribute to the severe motor derangement seen in CIPO patients. Neuro-ICC-muscular anomalies in CIPO might be related to known diseases or idiopathic if no associated disorder is present. Furthermore, certain cases of CIPO exhibit syndromic manifestations and familial clustering, implying a genetic basis.

Gut dysmotility is mostly caused by damage to the enteric nervous system, both structurally and functionally. The enteric nervous system is highly sophisticated and can govern almost all gastrointestinal activities, including motility, independently of the central and peripheral neurological systems.

Enteric neuropathies may share pathogenetic processes with central nervous system neurodegenerative illnesses due to their close similarities. Neurodegenerative pathways involve altered calcium signaling, mitochondrial failure, and free radical generation.

Patients with CIPO have reported alterations in the ICC network. Electron microscopy and/or KIT immunolabelling, along with confocal microscopy and image analysis, revealed a decrease in ICCs and structural abnormalities, including process loss and damage to the intracellular cytoskeleton and organelles. Significant changes in the ICC enteric network highlight the important involvement of nonneuronal cells in regulating gut motility.

== Diagnosis ==
The diagnosis of CIPO is mostly clinical, backed by radiographic documentation of dilated bowel with air-fluid level after exclusion of organic lesions obstructing the gut lumen, as determined by radiologic and/or endoscopic examinations. Thus, diagnostic investigations in patients with suspected CIPO are required to rule out mechanical blockage, identify possible sources of secondary forms, investigate underlying pathophysiological mechanisms, and reveal potential consequences.

In order to look into possible intestinal obstruction, radiologic examinations are essential. Simple and cheap to perform, plain film x-rays can show the traditional indicator of air-fluid levels and dilated bowel loops, which is best seen in the erect film. Abdominal x-rays, however, are unable to definitively differentiate between genuine mechanical intestinal obstruction and pseudo-obstruction. Afterwards, additional information is obtained by abdominal computed tomography (CT) imaging in order to rule out an extraluminal, gut wall, or intraluminal mechanically obstructive lesion.

Endoscopy's primary function in CIPO is to rule out mechanical obstructions in the foregut while also making it easier to get biopsies in order to rule out celiac disease. Colonoscopy is not usually necessary for the diagnosis of CIPO; however, in certain cases, it may be done for therapeutic decompression.

Identification of secondary forms of CIPO associated with potentially treatable disorders can be facilitated by laboratory testing. As a result, tests should be performed for serum glucose, thyroid-stimulating hormone, albumin, liver enzymes, vitamin B12, total blood count, and inflammatory markers (such as C-reactive protein and erythrocyte sedimentation rate). Patients with paraneoplastic syndrome should have their circulating antineuronal antibodies, such as ANNA-1/anti-Hu, identified.

Antroduodenal manometry is a useful tool for figuring out the pathogenesis of CIPO symptoms. The amplitude of contractions as well as the temporal and geographical structure of phasic contractions are evaluated by antroduodenal manometry. Enteric neuromuscular function is intact when normal patterns are present, such as the migrating motor complex during fasting and a shift to the postprandial motility pattern after a test meal. Manometry is important to distinguish between two conditions: neuropathy, in which contractions maintain normal amplitude but are uncoordinated and lack normal physiologic patterns, and myopathy, in which contraction amplitude is diminished but spatial and temporal organization is retained.

== Treatment ==
Treatment of CIPO is difficult. Following diagnosis, treatment goals should include preventing needless surgery, reestablishing electrolyte and fluid balance, enhancing nutritional status, managing infections, and reducing pain, nausea, vomiting, and bloating symptoms. If an underlying illness is the cause of CIPO, it should also be promptly addressed.

Maximizing oral intake is often recommended. Making up for any nutritional deficiencies should be the first step in any dietary treatment plan. Patients should be urged to eat small, frequent meals (five to six times a day), emphasizing protein and liquid calories, and to stay away from high-fiber and fat items.

Enteral feeding needs to be the next option if food intake is insufficient to meet nutritional needs. An enteral formula at goal rate can be used to finish a nasogastric or nasojejunal feeding trial prior to the implantation of a permanent feeding tube. Permanent enteral access may be inserted if it is tolerated without causing severe discomfort. It is usually recommended to bypass the stomach and feed directly into the small intestine if delayed gastric emptying is evident.

In patients with CIPO, parenteral nutrition is generally avoided unless enteral intake is insufficient to meet nutritional needs. This is because parenteral nutrition has been linked to pancreatitis, thrombus formation, cellulitis, sepsis, and nonalcoholic fatty liver disease, which can progress to fibrosis and cirrhosis. Unfortunately, because to the degenerative nature of the condition and the absence of viable treatments, many CIPO patients may eventually need parenteral nutrition. When receiving parenteral nutrition, patients should be encouraged and advised to consume as much oral food as they can tolerate.

The pharmaceutical treatment of CIPO aims to regulate symptoms and prevent complications. It is frequently necessary to co-prescribe analgesics, antiemetics, antisecretory, antispasmodics, laxatives, or antidiarrheal medications. Prokinetics are frequently used in an effort to regulate visceral sensitivity and enhance gastrointestinal motility.

== Outlook ==
CIPO typically progresses over time. Patients may experience symptom-free intervals followed by periods of severe symptoms that require emergency room visits and hospitalizations. According to one study, only 11% of people with CIPO experience asymptomatic periods between subacute obstructive episodes and do not need ongoing medical treatment.

CIPO sufferers often require complete parenteral nutrition due to their debilitating symptoms. Nutrition deficiency affects up to two-thirds of CIPO patients, with 30%-50% of adults requiring parenteral nutrition (PN) at some point.

The long-term prognosis for patients with CIPO is dismal. Chronic abdominal discomfort can lead to opiate dependence for many patients. In a long-term study of 59 patients with CIPO, 4 died from disease-related complications and 4 had small bowel transplant. Pediatric CIPO patients have a mortality rate ranging from 10% to 25% before reaching adulthood.

== Epidemiology ==
CIPO is a rare condition, hence specific information about its incidence and prevalence is unclear. According to a pediatric tertiary care institution, roughly 100 infants are born with CIPO each year in the US. This statistic does not accurately reflect the prevalence of CIPO because it excludes patients who develop it later in life. A review of 378 institutions by the Japanese Society of Gastroenterology found only 160 cases with suspected CIPO, with 138 (86.3%) meeting the rigorous criteria. Research indicates that females are more likely than males to experience CIPO, as seen by published adult patient studies.

== See also ==
- Gastroparesis
- Functional gastrointestinal disorder
