= Alexia Clark =

American personal trainer (born 1990)

Alexia Clark (born May 22, 1990) is an American personal trainer, fitness nutrition specialist, and social media influencer.

== Early life ==
Clark was born and raised in Phoenix, Arizona. After graduating from high school, she began auditioning for commercials and fitness model photo shoots. She attended Arizona State University and graduated with a Bachelor of Science degree, majoring in communications.

She worked as a project manager at a digital marketing company before quitting to focus full-time on a career in the fitness industry.

== Career ==
According to STRONG Fitness, Clark worked as a personal trainer for five years before beginning to evolve her personal Instagram account into a "fitness page" around 2015.

In 2016, she entered a commercial sponsorship with American footwear and clothing company Reebok. That June, she partnered with women's fashion magazine Glamour to formulate a 30-day squat challenge. In August 2016, she recorded a workout program video for the Men's Health magazine.

In early 2017, Clark began sharing posting fitness videos to Instagram and Snapchat, and rapidly accumulated a following online. In mid-2017, she was featured as the cover athlete for STRONG Fitness Mag, with the magazine reporting that she had surpassed 1 million followers on Instagram.

By early 2019, she had 1.7 million followers on social media, and had been interviewed on ABC News' Good Morning America.

In 2020, The Wall Street Journal reported that her following on Instagram had reached 2 million.

She has also been featured several times in Women's Health, including on the lifestyle magazine's cover its March 2018 issue.

In 2024, Fit&Well reported that Clark's Instagram following had reached 2.6 million.

== Personal life ==
As of 2020, Clark resides in Scottsdale, Arizona.

In 2018, she told Women's Health that she does not post bikini photos online:

"It has never been about 'look at my body. It's always been, 'I want to help you, here's exercises that you can do, here's how to do them, here's a way to modify them, and here's something different.'"

In 2018, KPNX reported that a man, Issac Straus, had allegedly stalked Clark, violated a court order, and asked Clark's father for her hand in marriage:

"...despite continued rejections, Straus even reportedly involved Clark’s parents. Documents say he stopped by their Paradise Valley home numerous times – dropping off flowers for Mother’s Day and even trying to ask Clark’s father’s permission to marry his daughter."

According to Clark, Straus's unwanted advances forced her to change her routine and acquire a guard dog. She also changed gyms.

In 2021, People magazine reported that Clark had undergone emergency stomach surgery to repair twisted intestines.
