= Paraspinal inhibition =

Osteopathic procedure

Paraspinal inhibition is an osteopathic manipulative technique in which the fascia around the spine is softened with one's hands in order to decrease the sympathetic output from the sympathetic ganglion which reside in the paraspinal area. Doing so can act in a sympatholytic manner (inhibition of the sympathetic arm of the autonomic nervous system) and in specific areas can have benefits such as preventing a postoperative ileus (thoracolumbar junction).
