= Luc Colemont =

Belgian gastroenterologist

- Born: 9 March 1957 (age 69); Hasselt, Belgium
- Occupation: Gastroenterologist
- Known for: Founder of Stop Darmkanker

Luc Colemont (born 9 March 1957) is a Belgian gastroenterologist. He worked for 28 years at Sint-Vincentius Hospital in Antwerp and in 2010 started Stop Darmkanker ("Stop Colon Cancer"), an action group that promotes the early detection of colorectal cancer. It was registered as a non-profit association in 2012, and Colemont has worked for it full-time since 2016.

Colemont gives lectures on colorectal cancer in Belgium and abroad and uses media appearances to push for higher participation in the Flemish screening programme and for screening from the age of 45. Besides several books on the disease, he wrote a comic with illustrator Mario Boon about a man diagnosed with colon cancer. The Beweging Vlaanderen-Europa gave him a Gulden Spoor in 2023.

== Early life and medical career ==
Colemont was born in Hasselt. By his own account he wanted to become a doctor as a child. He studied medicine at the Limburgs Universitair Centrum (now Hasselt University) and at the University of Antwerp, and qualified as a physician in 1982. Five years later he spent a year of further training at the Mayo Clinic in Rochester, Minnesota, the King/Drew Medical Center in Los Angeles and the Klinikum der Stadt Mannheim. While at the Mayo Clinic's gastroenterology research unit he wrote a review with Michael Camilleri on chronic intestinal pseudo-obstruction, a rare condition in which the bowel behaves as if it were blocked although there is no physical obstruction. The paper appeared in Mayo Clinic Proceedings in January 1989. Other papers from the late 1980s and early 1990s appeared in international journals such as the American Journal of Physiology and Cancer.

Colemont joined Sint-Vincentius Hospital in Antwerp as a gastroenterologist in 1988 and stayed there for 28 years.

== Stop Darmkanker ==
During International Colorectal Cancer Awareness Month in March 2010, Colemont and a group of young people from the small Antwerp multimedia company Lonely Alien Productions ran an online campaign to break the taboo around the disease. Flanders had no population screening for colorectal cancer at the time. The campaign grew into Stop Darmkanker, which was formally registered as a non-profit association in July 2012.

The Flemish government started a screening programme in October 2013. People aged 56 to 74 received a free stool test by post every two years, and the lower age limit was later brought down to 50. When actor Brad Pitt turned 50 in December 2013, Colemont sent him an open letter with a stool test enclosed. He also toured Flanders with an inflatable model of the large intestine.

Through his investment company Alychlo, businessman Marc Coucke invested €2.5 million in the association. The money allowed Colemont to leave the hospital and work for Stop Darmkanker full-time from January 2016.

He has since given hundreds of lectures in Belgium and abroad. The 500th since his departure from the hospital came in November 2019, the 600th in Bilzen in April 2022, the 750th in Lommel in February 2025 and the 792nd in Oudenaarde in October 2025. He has also spoken in Italy, including at a congress in Rome. At the end of May 2026 he addressed about 450 doctors in Namur, at a symposium held for the twentieth anniversary of a local medical practice.

Together with the Limburgs Kankerfonds (Limburg Cancer Fund), Stop Darmkanker set up a chair at Hasselt University in 2023, where data scientists are building a dashboard of colorectal cancer figures. Since March 2024 Colemont has led the association together with health economist Dominique Vandijck of Ghent University.

For a 2024 campaign the association brought back the television character Meneer de Uil to urge people in their fifties to take the test. A year later it launched a self-test with the pharmacy chain Kruidvat, aimed at people who fall outside the age range of the screening programme. Colemont and Marc Coucke went on the talk show De Tafel van Gert in October 2025 to promote the stool test. On the same programme the lawyer Walter Damen spoke publicly for the first time about his own colorectal cancer. Damen later told Het Laatste Nieuws that he partly owed his life to Colemont. Pharmacies sold far more self-tests in the following days: 282 by mid-October, against 52 in all of October 2024.

== Views ==
Colemont wants screening to begin at 45, as it does in the United States, Australia and Luxembourg, on the grounds that colorectal cancer is increasingly found in younger people. He has also pressed for earlier screening in the Netherlands. In January 2020 he co-signed an open letter in De Telegraaf with Marthen Bakker of Stichting Stop Darmkanker Nederland and gastroenterologist Sjam Ganesh, asking the Dutch minister Bruno Bruins to lower the starting age of the Dutch programme from 55 to 50. After the actor James Van Der Beek died of colorectal cancer in February 2026, aged 48, Stop Darmkanker repeated its call for screening from 45. Eric Van Cutsem, chair of the Belgian Foundation Against Cancer, said the proposal was premature.

== Publications ==
Colemont has written several books on colorectal cancer. His comic Dirk, het leven is een strijd waard, drawn by Mario Boon, follows a man in his fifties who is told he has colon cancer; Europe Comics published it in English in 2019. The insurer Ageas handed out 70,000 copies of the Portuguese edition, João, in Portugal.

- Een wereld zonder darmkanker (Luster, 2010). ISBN 9789460580598
- Samen sterk tegen darmkanker (Luster, 2011). ISBN 9789460580956
- Stop Darmkanker. Kennis delen kan levens redden (LannooCampus, 2014). ISBN 9789401416665
- Helden met darmkanker (with Piet den Boer; Willems Uitgevers, 2018). ISBN 9789492419316
- John: Life is Worth Fighting For (with Mario Boon; Europe Comics, 2019)
- De grote boodschap. Hoe we samen darmkanker de wereld uit helpen (Borgerhoff & Lamberigts, 2024). ISBN 9789464778847

== Recognition ==
The Beweging Vlaanderen-Europa awarded Colemont its Gulden Spoor voor Maatschappelijke Uitstraling (Golden Spur for Social Impact) at a ceremony in Ghent on 7 July 2023.
