= Intestinal pseudo-obstruction =

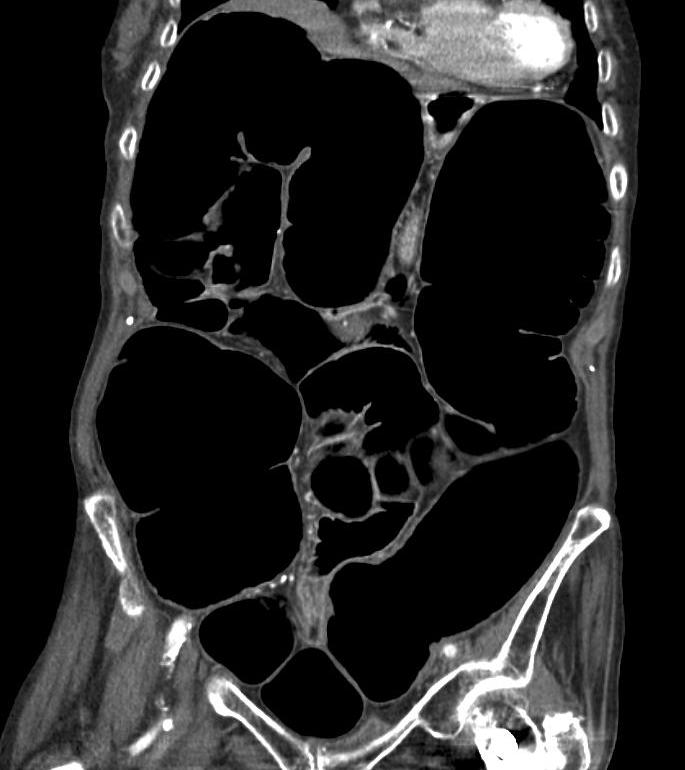
- Pronunciation: soo·doe/uhb·struhk·shn
- Specialty: Gastroenterology
- Symptoms: Abdominal pain, nausea, distention, vomiting, dysphagia, and constipation
- Complications: Intestinal failure, malabsorption, nutrient deficiencies, small intestinal bacterial overgrowth
- Duration: Varies according to etiology of disease. < 6 months is considered acute
- Causes: Idiopathic, Kawasaki disease, Parkinson's disease, Chagas disease, Hirschsprung's disease, intestinal hypogangliosis, collagen vascular disease, mitochondrial disease, endocrine disorders, medication side effects
- Diagnostic method: Signs and symptoms consistent with a mechanical intestinal obstruction with no identifying lesion.
- Differential diagnosis: Intestinal obstruction, Crohn's disease, ovarian torsion, ovarian cyst, neoplasm, infection (parasitic)
- Treatment: Aimed at management of complications (e.g. nutrition, hydration, pain relief).
- Prognosis: 10–25% mortality rate in chronic cases
- Frequency: Unknown

Intestinal pseudo-obstruction (IPO) is a clinical syndrome caused by severe impairment in the ability of the intestines to push food through. It is characterized by the signs and symptoms of intestinal obstruction without any lesion in the intestinal lumen. Clinical features mimic those seen with mechanical intestinal obstructions and can include abdominal pain, nausea, abdominal distension, vomiting, dysphagia and constipation depending upon the part of the gastrointestinal tract involved.

It is a difficult condition to diagnose, requiring exclusion of any other mechanical cause of obstruction. Many patients are diagnosed late in the course of disease after additional symptoms are seen. Mortality is also difficult to accurately determine. One retrospective study estimated mortality to be between 10 and 25% for chronic intestinal pseudo-obstruction (CIPO) and to vary greatly depending on the etiology of the condition. When present for less than six months, it is diagnosed as acute IPO or Ogilvie syndrome. Longer than this is considered chronic. Owing to the difficulty of diagnosis, few studies are available which have attempted to estimate its prevalence.

The condition can begin at any age. Most studies describing CIPO are in pediatric populations. It can be a primary condition (idiopathic or inherited) or caused by another disease (secondary). It can be a result of myriad of etiologies including infectious, parasitic, autoimmune, genetic, congenital, neurologic, toxic, endocrinological, or anatomical pathology.

Treatment targets nutritional support, improving intestinal motility, and minimizing surgical intervention. Bacterial overgrowth of the small intestine can occur in chronic cases – presenting as malabsorption, diarrhea, and nutrient deficiencies – which may require the use of antibiotics.

== Presentation ==
Clinical features of IPO can include abdominal pain, nausea, abdominal distension, vomiting, dysphagia, and constipation. Symptoms depend on the portion of the gastrointestinal tract involved and the duration of symptoms. Symptoms may occur intermittently and over a prolonged period of time. It is not unusual for patients to present several times owing to the nonspecific nature of the symptoms. Conditions and onset will vary if the disease is primary vs secondary and the underlying disease (if a secondary manifestation) and its management.

Symptoms indicative of advanced disease and possible intestinal failure include diarrhea, loss of appetite, sepsis, bloating, fatigue, signs of low volume status, and malabsorption including nutritional deficiencies and foul-smelling stools.

== Epidemiology ==
According to a 2013 study conducted in Japan, the estimated prevalence of CIPO was between 0.80 and 1.00 per 100,000 people, while its incidence rate was reported as 0.21 to 0.24 per 100,000. Furthermore, some studies have indicated that CIPO is more prevalent in females, a trend that may be attributable to the higher rates of secondary CIPO from conditions more common in this demographic. In the case of pediatric intestinal pseudo-obstruction (PIPO), the incidence was estimated at approximately 1 per 40,000 live births.

== Causes ==
In primary CIPO (the majority of chronic cases) the condition results from disruption of the intestine's ability to move food. These can be broadly classified as myopathic (affecting the smooth muscle), mesenchymopathic (affecting the interstitial cells of Cajal), or neuropathic (of the nervous system) of the gastrointestinal tract.

In some cases there appears to be a genetic association. One form has been associated with DXYS154, some associated with defective ACTG2 gene

Secondary chronic intestinal pseudo-obstruction can occur as a consequence of a number of other conditions including:

- Hirschsprung's disease – the absence of colonic nerve cells
- Chagas' disease – a chronic parasitic infection of the colon leading to loss of nerve endings
- Kawasaki disease - a rare presentation for this particular autoimmune disorder of the vasculature
- Parkinson's disease - related to the neurodegeneration of gastrointestinal tract
- Autoimmune conditions — conditions including systemic lupus erythematosus and scleroderma lead to collagen vascular deposition and gastrointestinal motility disruption
- Mitochondrial disease - IPO is a known presentation for mitochondrial disease
- Endocrine disorders
- Certain medications.

The term may be used synonymously with enteric neuropathy if a neurological cause is suspected.

== Diagnosis ==
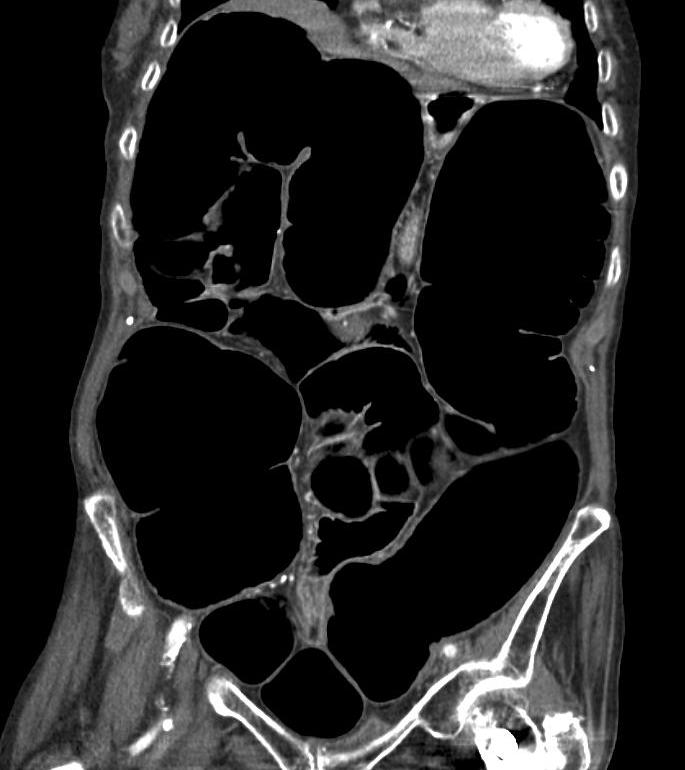
CT-Scan showing a coronal section of the abdomen of an elderly lady with an IPO.

The symptoms of IPO are nonspecific. It is not unusual for patients to present repeatedly and to undergo numerous tests. Mechanical causes of intestinal obstruction must be excluded to reach a diagnosis of pseudo-obstruction. Attempts must also be made to determine whether the IPO is the result of a primary or secondary condition. A diagnostic work-up may include:

- Gastric motility studies
- Imaging studies:
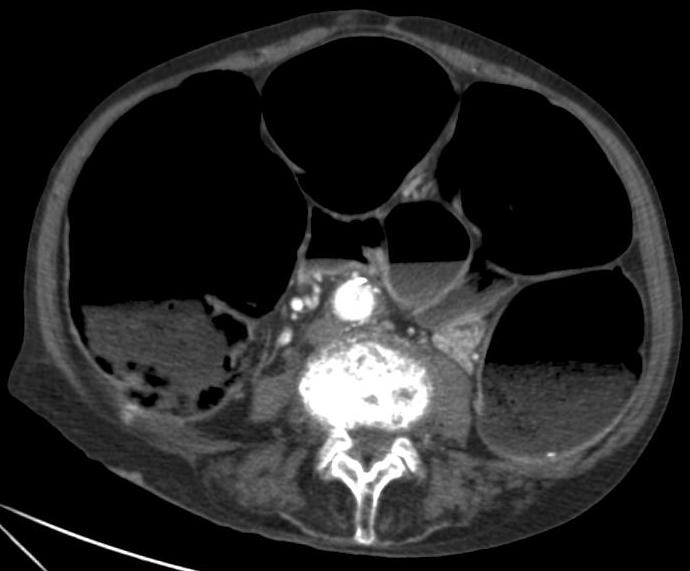
  - CT-Scan showing a Cross-section of the abdomen of an elderly lady with an IPO.
    X-rays – may show intestinal air fluid levels (seen with true mechanical intestinal obstruction)
  - CT scans
  - Barium enema
- Blood tests
- Upper and lower endoscopies
- Manometry – used to measure pressure of esophagus and stomach

=== Classification ===
Pseudo-obstruction syndromes are classified as acute or chronic based on their clinical appearance. Acute colonic pseudo-obstruction (ACPO; sometimes known as Ogilvie syndrome) causes the colon to become grossly dilated; if not decompressed, the individual risks perforation, peritonitis, and death. Chronic intestinal pseudo-obstruction is a chronic disorder.

== Treatment ==
Treatment for IPO (acute or chronic) is aimed at removing the disease process and/or managing the complications present. Focus is placed on management of pain, gastrointestinal symptoms, nutritional deficiencies, fluid status, infection control, and improving quality of life. When CIPO is secondary to another disease, treatment is addressed towards the underlying condition. Surgery is sometimes required in severe cases of CIPO.

=== Medical treatment ===
Prucalopride, pyridostigmine, metoclopramide, cisapride, erythromycin, and octreotide are medications that aim to enhance intestinal motility.

Intestinal stasis, which may lead to bacterial overgrowth and subsequently, diarrhea or malabsorption, is treated with antibiotics.

Nutritional deficiencies are treated by encouraging patients to avoid foods that increase distention and are difficult to digest (e.g. those high in fat and fibre), consuming small frequent meals (5–6 per day), focusing on liquids and soft food. Reducing intake of poorly absorbed sugar alcohols may be of benefit. Referral to an accredited dietitian is recommended. If dietary changes are unsuccessful in meeting nutritional requirements and energy needs, enteral nutrition is used. Many patients eventually require parenteral nutrition.

Total parenteral nutrition (TPN) is a form of long-term nutritional treatment reserved for patients that have severe pseudo-obstruction. TPN dependent patients require frequent checkups to monitor catheter function, check liver enzyme levels, and evaluate for signs of blood infections. TPN format is typically changed depending on loss/gain of weight and bloodwork results, and is specially formulated to meet each individual patient's needs.

=== Procedures ===
Intestinal decompression by tube placement in a small stoma can also be used to reduce distension and pressure within the gut. The stoma may be a gastrostomy, jejunostomy, ileostomy, or cecostomy. These may be used for feed (e.g. gastrostomy and jejunostomy) or to flush the intestines.

Colostomy or ileostomy can bypass affected parts if they are distal to (come after) the stoma. For instance, if only the colon is affected, an ileostomy may be helpful. Either of these ostomies are typically placed at or a few centimeters below the patient's navel per doctor recommendation based on the affected area of the intestines as well as concerns for patient comfort and future physical growth for children.

The total removal of the colon, called a colectomy or resection of affected parts of the colon may be needed if part of the gut dies (for instance toxic megacolon), or if there is a localized area of dysmotility.

Gastric and colonic pacemakers have been tried. These are strips placed along the colon or stomach which create an electric discharge intended to cause the muscle to contract in a controlled manner.

A potential solution, albeit radical, is intestinal transplantation. This is only appropriate in the case of intestinal failure. These procedures are most frequently described in pediatric cases of CIPO. One operation involving multi-organ transplant of the pancreas, stomach, duodenum, small intestine, and liver, and was performed by Doctor Kareem Abu-Elmagd on Gretchen Miller.

=== Potential treatments ===
Further research is necessary into other treatments which may alleviate symptoms. These include stem-cell transplantation and fecal microbiota transplantation. Cannabis has not been studied with regards to CIPO. Any claims to its efficacy for use in CIPO are speculative.

== Related disorders ==
- Ogilvie syndrome: acute pseudoobstruction of the colon in severely ill debilitated patients.
- Hirschsprung's disease: enlargement of the colon due to lack of development of autonomic ganglia.
- Intestinal neuronal dysplasia: a disease of motor neurons leading to the bowels.
- Bowel obstruction: mechanical or functional obstruction of the bowel, most commonly due to adhesions, hernias or neoplasms.
- Enteric neuropathy: alternative name sometimes used for diagnosis in UK

== See also ==
- Gastroparesis: ineffective neuromuscular contractions (peristalsis) of the stomach, resulting in food and liquid remaining in the stomach for a prolonged period of time before entering the intestine.
