= Enteric neuropathy =

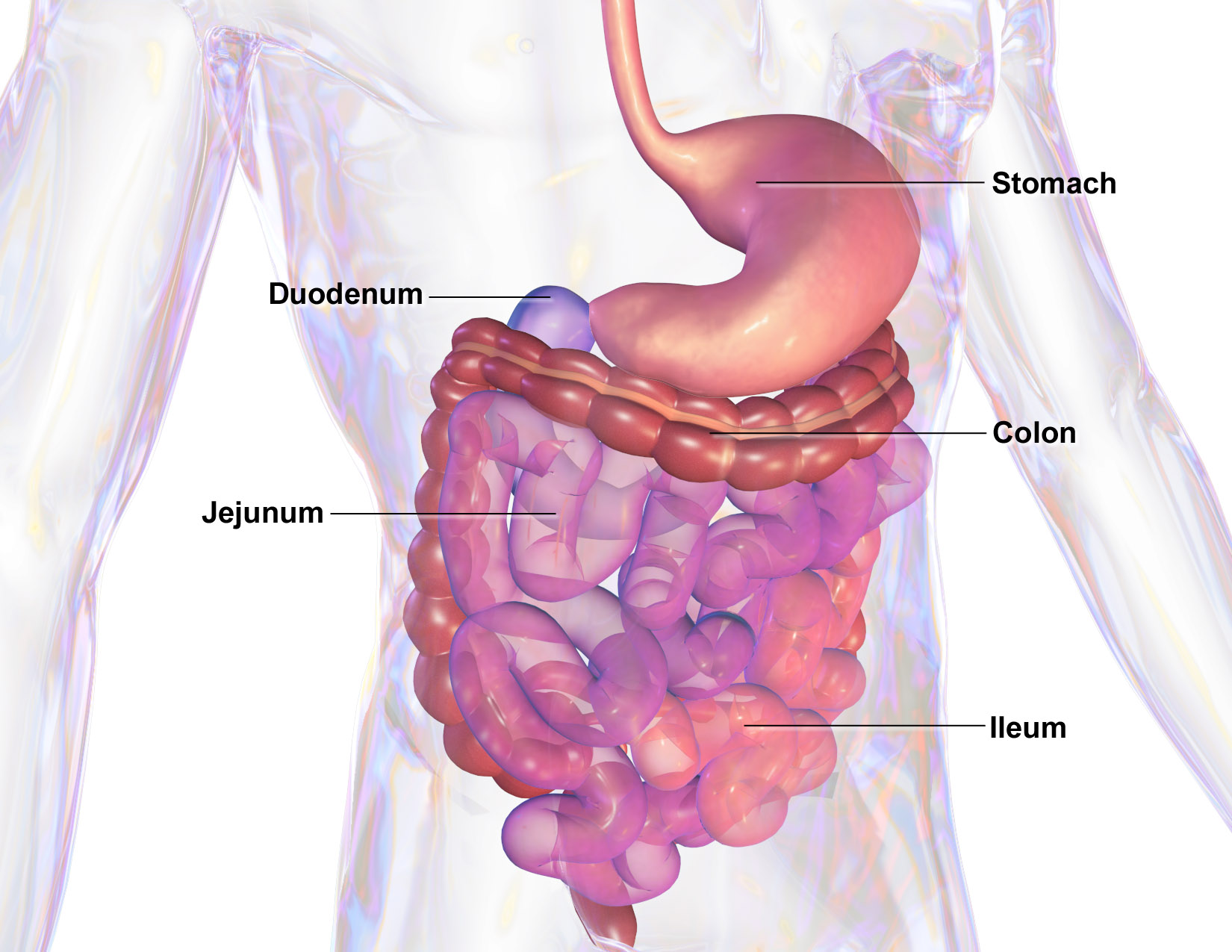
- Gastro Intestinal system
- Specialty: Gastroenterology, Neurology

Enteric neuropathy is a degenerative neuromuscular condition of the digestive system. In simple terms the gut stops functioning, due to degradation of the nerves and muscles. The condition affects all parts of the digestive tract. There is no known cure or treatment for enteric neuropathy at this time; it is only possible to work on symptom management.

The name enteric neuropathy only seems to be used for diagnosis within the UK. The most common name worldwide for this condition is intestinal pseudo-obstruction.

== Symptoms and signs ==
Symptoms include chronic pain, nausea, vomiting, diarrhoea, constipation, bloating and abdominal abnormalities. In addition malabsorption and poor nutrition are common, as the digestive system begins to fail. Symptom management is very important, and the main priority is usually to address pain.

== Diagnosis ==
The diagnosis of enteric neuropathy is rather difficult, in that many symptoms present in ways that are common to many other bowel- and gut-related diseases. It is common that many people undergo many surgeries, sometimes over several years, to attempt to combat other possible diseases. The diagnosis itself is conducted by a physician based on multiple tests and is subjective rather than definitive, which for those who have enteric neuropathy will show signs of severe abnormalities in the movement of the gut. An operation to take a section of muscle for biopsy which, if it shows signs of nerve degradation, assists in the diagnosis.
