= Barbed suture =

Type of knotless surgical suture

A barbed suture is a type of knotless surgical suture that has barbs on its surface. While suturing tissue, these barbs penetrate inside the tissue and lock them into place, eliminating the need for knots to tie the suture. Conventional sutures rely on a surgeon's ability to tie secure knots; barbed sutures provide a knotless alternative in some surgical situations. Barbed sutures are primarily used in cosmetic surgery.

In recent years there has been an increasing uptake in the use of barbed sutures, particularly in minimally invasive and laparoscopic procedures where they may reduce operating time and improve surgical efficiency. However, little is known about the adverse events associated with these new materials and concerns have arisen regarding their safety in certain procedures. Although barbed sutures provide an attractive means to allow easier and faster laparoscopic suturing, they should be used carefully in inframesocolic surgery and the suture end cut and buried to avoid inadvertent attachment to the small bowel or its mesentery. which may lead to small bowel obstruction presenting in the early postoperative period. Animal study with barbed sutures (Barbed Glycomer™ 631) exhibited more cohesive bonding, no complications, and higher suture retention strength, as compared to V-LOC™ 90 Absorbable Wound Closure Device.

== See also ==
- Surgical suture
- Surgical staple
- Steri strip
- Cyanoacrylate
