= William Heneage Ogilvie =

British surgeon and writer

- Born: July 14, 1887; Valparaíso
- Died: April 15, 1971 (aged 83)
- Occupations: Surgeon, writer

Major General Sir William Heneage Ogilvie K.B.E., M.Ch., F.R.C.S. (July 14, 1887 – April 15, 1971) was a British surgeon, medical essayist, and yachtsman.

== Early life ==
Ogilvie was born in Valparaíso, on 14 July 1887 during his British father's engineering career in Chile. In 1910, he attended Clifton College and New College, Oxford pursuing physiology. He then attended Guy's Hospital, a predecessor institution of GKT School of Medical Education, for his medical training and obtained his FRCS by 1920.

== Later life ==
A great deal of Ogilvie's adult life was spent in the British Army, where he served in the Balkan Wars in 1912, the first world war in France, and finally as a consulting surgeon with the Middle East and East Africa Forces in the second world war, attaining the rank of Major-General and KBE.

Ogilvie favoured a low-carbohydrate high-fat diet. He wrote the foreword for Richard Mackarness' book Eat Fat and Grow Slim in 1958. The Ogilvie syndrome, an acute illness affecting the colon, is named after Ogilvie, who first reported it in 1948.

Joyce Cary's novel The Horse's Mouth is dedicated 'to Heneage Ogilvie'.

== Personal life ==
Ogilvie married Vere Quitter in 1915 and raised three children.

== Selected publications ==
- Surgery, Orthodox and Heterodox (1948)
- No Miracles Among Friends (1959)
- The Tired Business Man (1964)

== See also ==
- Ogilvie syndrome
