= Ogilvie syndrome =

- Other names: Acute colonic pseudo-obstruction
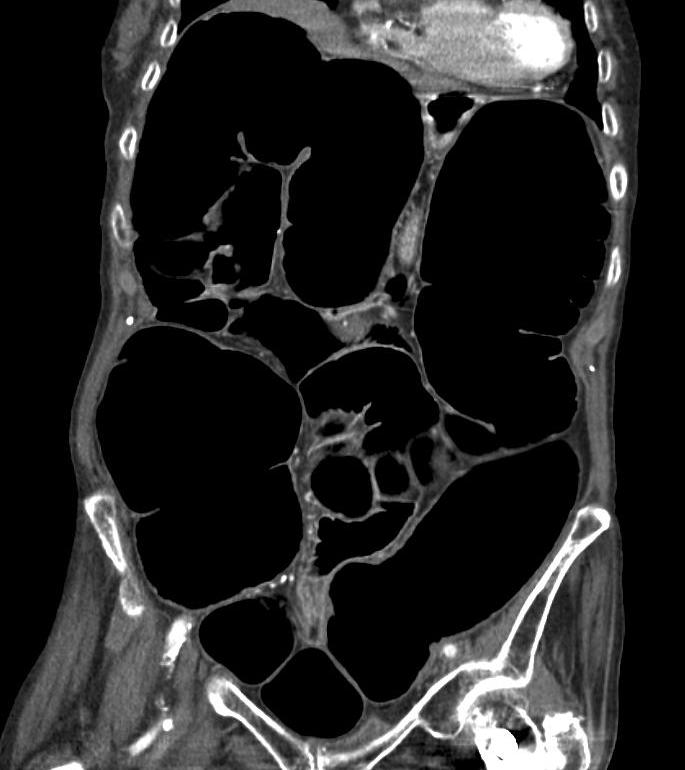
- CT-Scan showing a coronal section of the abdomen of an elderly woman with Ogilvie syndrome
- Specialty: Gastroenterology

Ogilvie syndrome, or acute colonic pseudo-obstruction, is the acute dilatation of the colon in the absence of any mechanical obstruction in severely ill patients.

Acute colonic pseudo-obstruction is characterized by massive dilatation of the cecum (diameter > 10 cm) and right colon on abdominal X-ray. It is a type of megacolon, sometimes referred to as "acute megacolon," to distinguish it from toxic megacolon.

The condition carries the name of the British surgeon Sir William Heneage Ogilvie (1887–1971), who first reported it in 1948.

Ogilvie syndrome is an acute illness, which means it occurs suddenly and temporarily, and it only affects the colon. "Intestinal pseudo-obstruction" is a broad term that refers to any paralysis of the intestines that is not caused by a mechanical obstruction. Some individuals develop chronic intestinal pseudo-obstruction as a result of a chronic disease or a congenital condition.

== Signs and symptoms ==
Usually the patient has abdominal distention, pain and altered bowel movements. There may also be nausea and vomiting.

== Cause ==
Ogilvie syndrome may occur after surgery, especially following coronary artery bypass surgery and total joint replacement. Drugs that disturb colonic motility (such as anticholinergics or opioid analgesics) contribute to the development of this condition.

== Pathophysiology ==
The exact mechanism is not known. The probable explanation is imbalance in the regulation of colonic motor activity by the autonomic nervous system. It has been postulated that reactivation of varicella zoster virus (which causes chickenpox and shingles) in the enteric ganglia may be a cause of Ogilvie syndrome.

Acute megacolon develops because of abnormal intestinal motility. Normal colonic motility requires integration of myogenic, neural, and hormonal influences. The enteric nervous system is independent but is connected to the central nervous system by sympathetic and parasympathetic nerves. The targets of the enteric neurons are muscle cells, secretory cells, endocrine cells, microvasculature, and inflammatory cells. The neurons in the enteric plexuses are stimulated by a food bolus, which both distends the gut and stimulates the mucosal surface, leading to the release of factors that stimulate interneurons. The stimulated interneurons transmit excitatory signals proximally, which cause contraction and inhibitory signals distally, and these in turn cause relaxation. These signals are transmitted by the neurotransmitters acetylcholine and serotonin, among others.

Acute megacolon can also lead to ischemic necrosis in massively dilated intestinal segments. This is explained by Pascal's law and Laplaces's law. Pascal's principle states that a change in pressure at any point in an enclosed fluid at rest is transmitted undiminished to all points in the fluid; the pressure across all parts of the lumen is equal. Laplace's law states that:

$T=\frac{P r}{2t}$

where T is wall tension, P is pressure, r is the radius, and t is wall thickness. Since the wall tension is proportionate to the radius, a dilated intestinal segment has a greater wall tension than a nondilated segment; if the dilatation and tension are sufficiently great, blood flow may be obstructed and ischemia of the bowel will occur. Ogilivie syndrome may precipitate volvulus.

== Diagnosis ==
Diagnosis starts with physical exam, observation, and interview of the patient. Imaging to diagnose dilation of the colon involves one view abdominal xray or obstruction series (PA chest, erect abdomen, and supine abdomen images). If further imaging is needed CT may be ordered.

== Treatment ==
It usually resolves with conservative therapy stopping oral ingestions and employing a nasogastric tube, but resolution may require colonoscopic decompression which is successful in 70% of the cases. A study published in the New England Journal of Medicine showed that neostigmine is a potent pharmacological way of decompressing the colon. According to the American Society for Gastrointestinal Endoscopy (ASGE), it should be considered prior to colonoscopic decompression. The use of neostigmine is not without risk since it can induce bradyarrhythmia and bronchospasms. Therefore, atropine should be within immediate reach when this therapy is used.

== Prognosis ==
Ogilvie syndrome is a serious medical disorder. Its mortality rate can be as high as 30%. The high rate is likely a measure that this syndrome is seen in critically ill patients, rather than this syndrome being in itself lethal, although it can also present in otherwise healthy individuals (especially if the disorder was induced by pharmacologic agents). Drug-induced megacolon (such as from clozapine) has been associated with mortality as high as 27.5%.
