= Spastic intestinal obstruction =

Intestinal blockage caused by intestine spasms

Spastic intestinal obstruction is an obstruction of the intestine that causes a result closure of an intestinal segment due to intestinal wall spasms (often located in one place and persist). Dr Murphy (1896) was the first to describe this disease. It is clinically and extremely rare, but it does show its presence.

Esophageal dysphagia without identifying this early will cause further problems.
