= Myogenic tone =

Muscle tone driven by the muscle itself

Myogenic tone is a state of muscle tone in living creatures that originates from the muscle itself rather than from the autonomic nervous system or from hormone processes. It may be contrasted with neurogenic tone, which is created by actions of the autonomic nervous system.
