= Gastric distension =

Enlargement of the stomach

Gastric distention is the enlargement of the stomach, and can be due to a number of causes.

Physiologic (normal) gastric distension occurs when eating. Distension of the upper stomach stimulates the secretion of stomach acid, while distension of the lower stomach stimulates gastrin secretion. Distension of the stomach also stimulates the secretion of ghrelin.

Other causes include:

- binge eating associated with bulimia nervosa
- tumors causing obstruction
- diabetic neuropathy
- scarring due to pyloric gastritis
- delayed gastric emptying

To identify the cause of gastric distention, an upper endoscopy or barium upper GI imaging should be done.
