= Bowel obstruction =

Mechanical or functional obstruction of the intestines

- Other names: Intestinal obstruction, intestinal occlusion
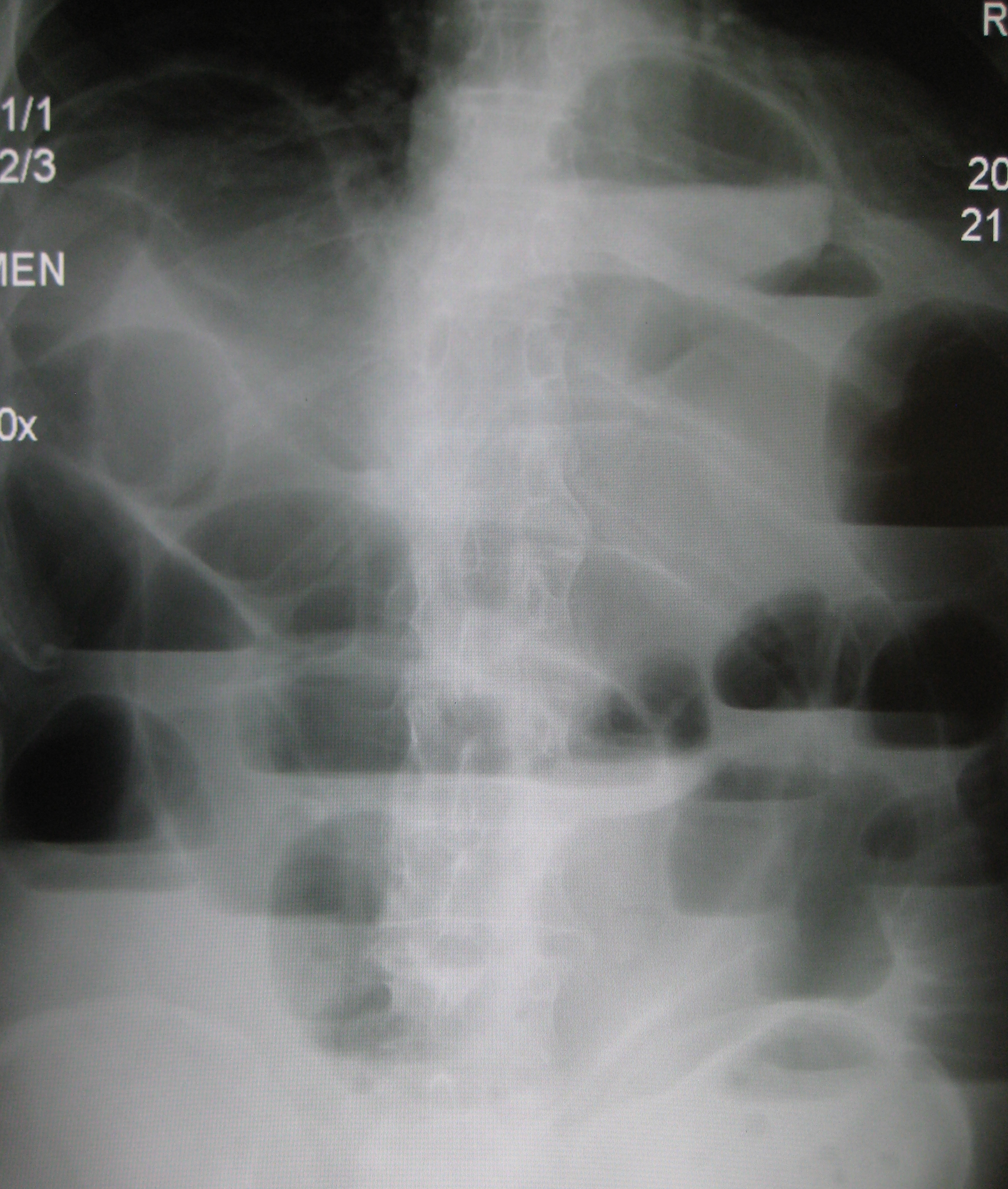
- Upright abdominal X-ray demonstrating a small bowel obstruction. Note multiple air fluid levels.
- Specialty: General surgery
- Symptoms: Abdominal pain, vomiting, bloating, not passing gas
- Complications: Sepsis, bowel ischemia, bowel perforation
- Causes: Adhesions, hernias, volvulus, endometriosis, inflammatory bowel disease, appendicitis, tumors, diverticulitis, ischemic bowel, tuberculosis, intussusception
- Diagnostic method: Medical imaging
- Treatment: Conservative care, surgery
- Frequency: 3.2 million (2015)
- Deaths: 238,733 (2019)

Bowel obstruction, also known as intestinal obstruction, is a mechanical or functional obstruction of the intestines that prevents the normal movement of the products of digestion. Either the small bowel or large bowel may be affected. Signs and symptoms include abdominal pain, vomiting, bloating and not passing gas. Mechanical obstruction is the cause of about 5 to 15% of cases of severe abdominal pain of sudden onset requiring admission to hospital.

Causes of bowel obstruction include adhesions, hernias, volvulus, endometriosis, inflammatory bowel disease, appendicitis, tumors, diverticulitis, ischemic bowel, tuberculosis and intussusception. Small bowel obstructions are most often due to adhesions and hernias, while large bowel obstructions are most often due to tumors and volvulus. The diagnosis may be made on plain X-rays; however, CT scan is more accurate. Ultrasound or MRI may help in the diagnosis of children or pregnant women.

The condition may be treated conservatively or with surgery. Typically intravenous fluids are given, a nasogastric (NG) tube is placed through the nose into the stomach to decompress the intestines, and pain medications are given. Antibiotics are often given. In small bowel obstruction about 25% require surgery. Complications may include sepsis, bowel ischemia and bowel perforation.

About 3.2 million cases of bowel obstruction occurred in 2015, which resulted in 264,000 deaths. Both sexes are equally affected and the condition can occur at any age. Bowel obstruction has been documented throughout history, with cases detailed in the Ebers Papyrus of 1550 BC and by Hippocrates.

== Signs and symptoms ==
Depending on the level of obstruction, bowel obstruction can present with abdominal pain, abdominal distension, and constipation. Bowel obstruction may be complicated by dehydration and electrolyte abnormalities due to vomiting; respiratory compromise from pressure on the diaphragm by a distended abdomen, or aspiration of vomitus; bowel ischemia or perforation from prolonged distension or pressure from a foreign body and subsequently sepsis due to bowel flora.

Tinkly bowel sounds
Tinkly bowel sounds as heard with a stethoscope in someone with a small bowel obstruction.

In small bowel obstruction, the pain tends to be colicky (cramping and intermittent) in nature, with spasms lasting a few minutes. The pain tends to be central and mid-abdominal. Vomiting may occur before constipation. Common physical exam findings may include signs of dehydration, abdominal distension with tympany, nonspecific abdominal tenderness, and high pitched tinkly bowel sounds.

In large bowel obstruction, the pain is felt lower in the abdomen and the spasms last longer. Common symptoms include abdominal pain, distension, and severe constipation. Constipation occurs earlier and vomiting may be less prominent. Proximal obstruction of the large bowel may present as small bowel obstruction. Patients may notice a history of bloating and narrowing of stools before the onset of more severe symptoms. Symptoms can present quickly in the cases of volvulus and can present over a longer period of time in the setting of cancer. Common physical exam findings may include a palpable hernia, abdominal distension with tympany, nonspecific lower abdominal tenderness, and a rectal mass.

== Causes ==
=== Small bowel obstruction ===
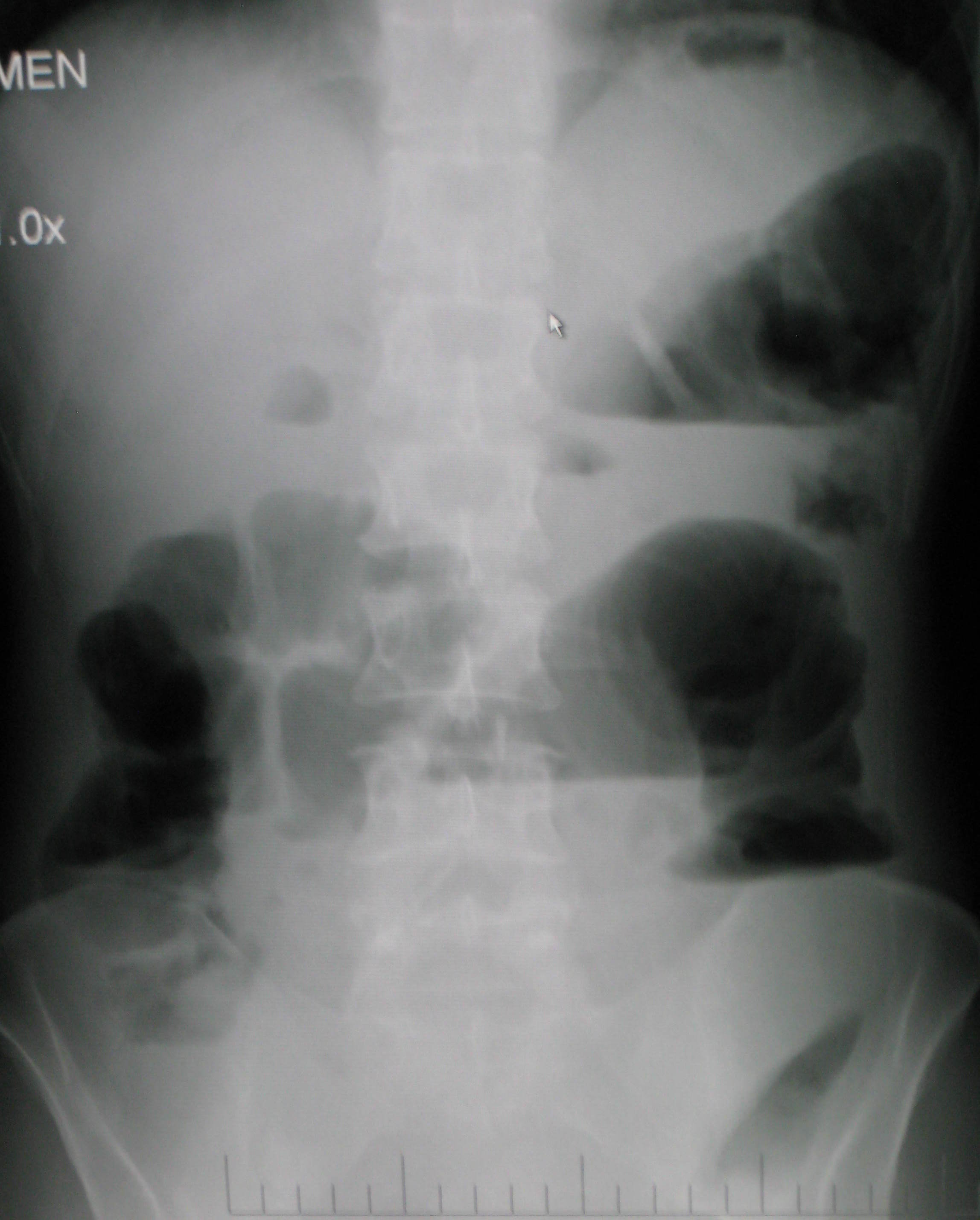
Upright abdominal X-ray demonstrating a small bowel obstruction. Note multiple air fluid levels.

Causes of small bowel obstruction include:

- Adhesions from previous abdominal surgery (by far the most common cause)
- Barbed sutures
- Pseudoobstruction
- Hernias containing bowel
- Crohn's disease causing adhesions or inflammatory strictures
- Neoplasms, benign or malignant
- Intussusception
- Volvulus
- Superior mesenteric artery syndrome, a compression of the duodenum by the superior mesenteric artery and the abdominal aorta
- Ischemic strictures
- Foreign bodies (e.g. gallstones in gallstone ileus, swallowed objects such as expandable water toys)
- Intestinal atresia
- Urinary retention

After abdominal surgery, the incidence of small bowel obstruction from any cause is 9%. In those where the cause of the obstruction was clear, adhesions are the single most common cause; in developed countries, about three-quarters of all small bowel obstructions are caused by postoperative adhesions.

=== Large bowel obstruction ===
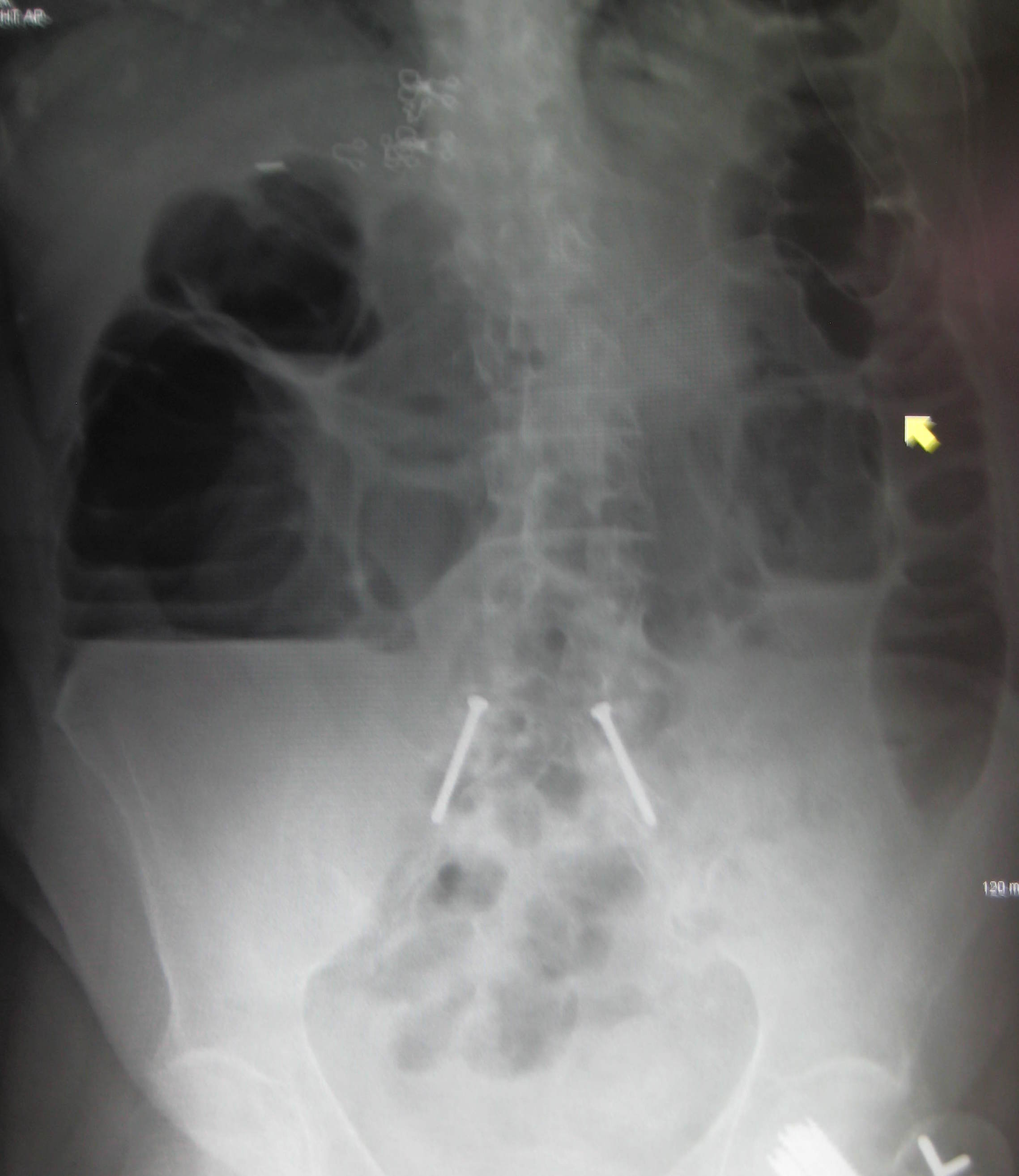
Upright abdominal X-ray of a person with a large bowel obstruction showing multiple air fluid levels and dilated loops of bowel

Causes of large bowel obstruction include:

- Neoplasms / cancer
- Diverticulitis / Diverticulosis
- Hernias
- Inflammatory bowel disease
- Colonic volvulus (sigmoid, caecal, transverse colon)
- Adhesions
- Constipation
- Fecal impaction
- Fecaloma
- Colon atresia
- Intestinal pseudoobstruction
- Endometriosis
- Narcotic induced (especially with the large doses given to cancer or palliative care patients)

==== Outlet obstruction ====
Outlet obstruction is a sub-type of large bowel obstruction and refers to conditions affecting the anorectal region that obstruct defecation, specifically conditions of the pelvic floor and anal sphincters. Outlet obstruction can be classified into four groups.

- Functional outlet obstruction
  - Inefficient inhibition of the internal anal sphincter
    - Short-segment Hirschsprung's disease
    - Chagas disease
    - Hereditary internal sphincter myopathy
  - Inefficient relaxation of the striated pelvic floor muscles
    - Anismus (pelvic floor dyssynergia)
    - Multiple sclerosis
    - Spinal cord lesions
- Mechanical outlet obstruction
  - Internal intussusception
  - Enterocele
- Dissipation of force vector
  - rectocele
  - Descending perineum
  - Rectal prolapse
- Impaired rectal sensitivity
  - Megarectum
  - Rectal hyposensitivity

== Diagnosis ==
Small bowel dilation on CT scan in adults
Diameter	Assessment
<2.5 cm	Non-dilated
2.5–2.9 cm	Mildly dilated
3–4 cm	Moderately dilated
>4 cm	Severely dilated

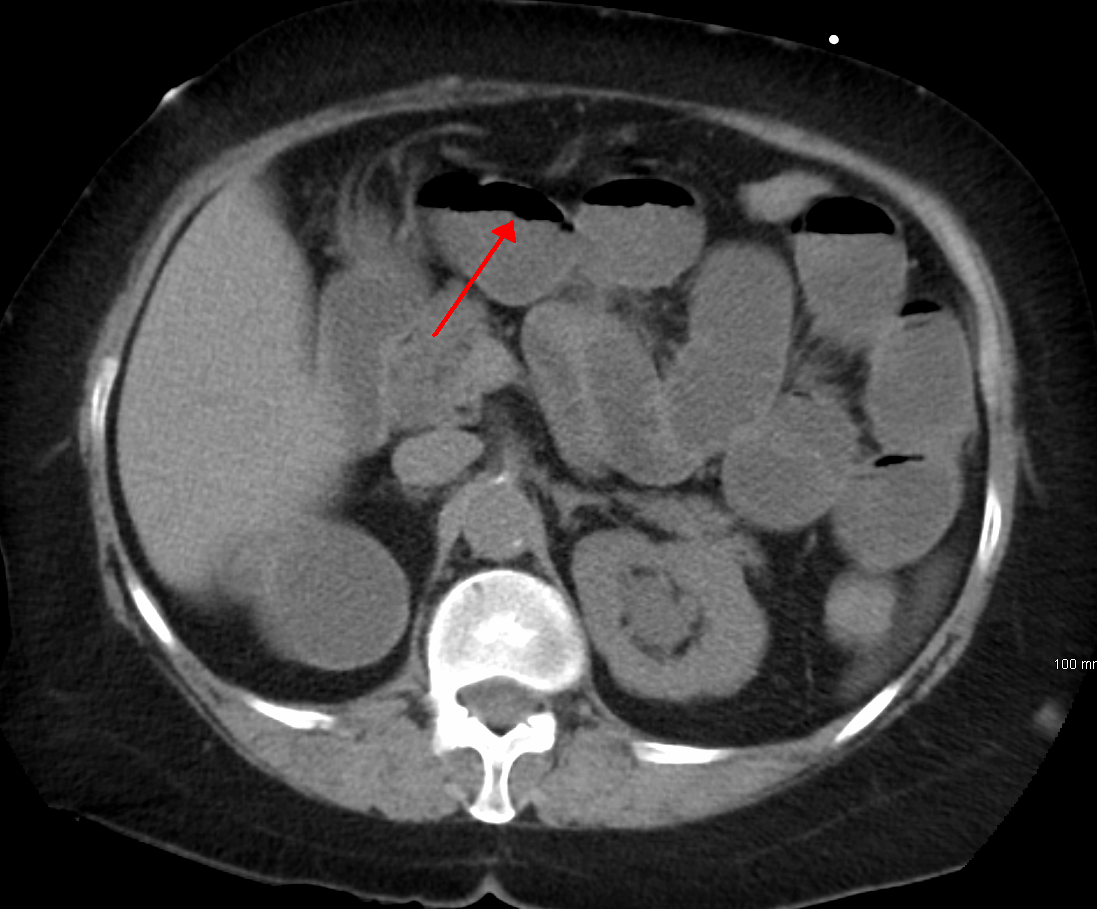
A small bowel obstruction as seen on CT

Average inner diameters and ranges of different sections of the large intestine.

The main diagnostic tools are blood tests, X-rays of the abdomen, CT scanning, and ultrasound. If a mass is identified, biopsy may determine the nature of the mass.

Radiological signs of bowel obstruction include bowel distension (small bowel loops dilated >3 cm) and the presence of multiple (more than 2) air-fluid levels on supine and erect abdominal radiographs. Ultrasounds may be as useful as CT scanning to make the diagnosis.

Contrast enema or small bowel series or CT scan can be used to define the level of obstruction, whether the obstruction is partial or complete, and to help define the cause of the obstruction. The appearance of water-soluble contrast in the cecum on an abdominal radiograph within 24 hours of it being given by mouth predicts resolution of an adhesive small bowel obstruction with sensitivity of 97% and specificity of 96%.

Colonoscopy, small bowel investigation with ingested camera or push endoscopy, and laparoscopy are other diagnostic options.

Small bowel obstruction on ultrasound

Small bowel obstruction on ultrasound

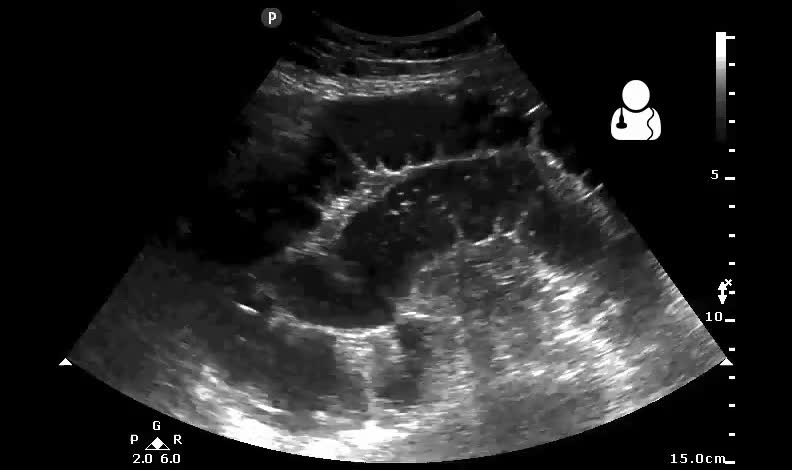
Small bowel obstruction on ultrasound

=== Differential diagnosis ===
Differential diagnoses of bowel obstruction include:

- Ileus
- Pseudo-obstruction or Ogilvie's syndrome
- Intra-abdominal sepsis
- Pneumonia or other systemic illness

== Treatment ==
Treatment of small and large bowel obstructions are initially similar and non-operative management is usually the initial management strategy as the majority of small bowel obstruction resolve spontaneously with non-operative management. Patients are monitored by the surgical team for signs of improvement and resolution of the obstruction on imaging; if the obstruction does not clear then surgical management for the treatment of the causative lesion is required. In malignant large bowel obstruction, endoscopically placed self-expanding metal stents may be used to temporarily relieve the obstruction as a bridge to surgery, or as palliation. Diagnosis of the type of bowel obstruction is normally conducted through initial plain radiograph of the abdomen, luminal contrast studies, computed tomography scan, or ultrasonography prior to determining the best type of treatment.

Further research is needed to find out if parenteral nutrition is of benefit to people with an inoperable blockage of the bowel caused by advanced cancer.

=== Small bowel obstruction ===
In the management of small bowel obstructions, a commonly quoted surgical aphorism is: "never let the sun rise or set on small-bowel obstruction" because about 5.5% of small bowel obstructions are ultimately fatal if treatment is delayed. Improvements in radiological imaging of small bowel obstructions allow for confident distinction between simple obstructions, that can be treated conservatively, and obstructions that are surgical emergencies (volvulus, closed-loop obstructions, ischemic bowel, incarcerated hernias, etc.). Exam findings of bowel compromise requiring immediate surgery include: severe abdominal pain, signs of peritonitis such as rebound tenderness, elevated heart rate, fever, and elevated inflammatory markers on lab work, such as lactic acid.

A small flexible tube (nasogastric tube) may be inserted through the nose into the stomach to help decompress the dilated bowel. This tube is uncomfortable but relieves the abdominal cramps, distention, and vomiting. Intravenous therapy is utilized and the urine output may be monitored with a catheter in the bladder.

Most people with SBO are initially managed conservatively because in many cases, the bowel will open up. Some adhesions loosen up and the obstruction resolves. The patient is examined several times a day, and X-ray images are made to ensure he or she is not getting clinically worse.

Conservative treatment involves insertion of a nasogastric tube, correction of dehydration and electrolyte abnormalities. Opioid pain relievers may be used for patients with severe pain but alternate pain relievers are preferred as opioids can decrease bowel motility.Antiemetics may be administered if the patient is vomiting. Adhesive obstructions often settle without surgery. If the obstruction is complete surgery is usually required.

Most patients improve with conservative care in 2–5 days. When the obstruction is cancer, surgery is the only treatment. Those with bowel resection or lysis of adhesions usually stay in the hospital a few more days until they can eat and walk.

Small bowel obstruction caused by Crohn's disease, peritoneal carcinomatosis, sclerosing peritonitis, radiation enteritis, and postpartum bowel obstruction are typically treated conservatively, i.e. without surgery.

== Prognosis ==
The prognosis for non-ischemic cases of SBO is good with mortality rates of 3–5%, while prognosis for SBO with ischemia is fair with mortality rates as high as 30%.

Cases of SBO related to cancer are more complicated and require additional intervention to address the malignancy, recurrence, and metastasis, and thus are associated with a more poor prognosis. Surgical options in patients with malignant bowel obstruction need to be considered carefully as while it may provide relief of symptoms in the short term, there is a high risk of mortality and re-obstruction.

All cases of abdominal surgical intervention are associated with increased risk of future small-bowel obstructions. Statistics from U.S. healthcare report 18.1% re-admittance rate within 30 days for patients who undergo SBO surgery. More than 90% of patients also form adhesions after major abdominal surgery. Common consequences of these adhesions include small-bowel obstruction, chronic abdominal pain, pelvic pain, and infertility.

== History ==
Surgical treatment of large bowel obstruction, typically due to large tumors, was attempted as early as 1776, though long-term survival and wider use waited for the development of sterile technique and anesthesia in the 19th century. The first known case of small bowel obstruction due to post-surgical adhesions was reported in 1872. The first child to survive surgery for intussusception was a two-year-old girl in 1871.

== See also ==
- Impaction (animals) – Blockage of the intestines
- Neonatal bowel obstruction – Blockage of the intestines in children
- Spastic intestinal obstruction
