= Abdominal distension =

Physical symptom

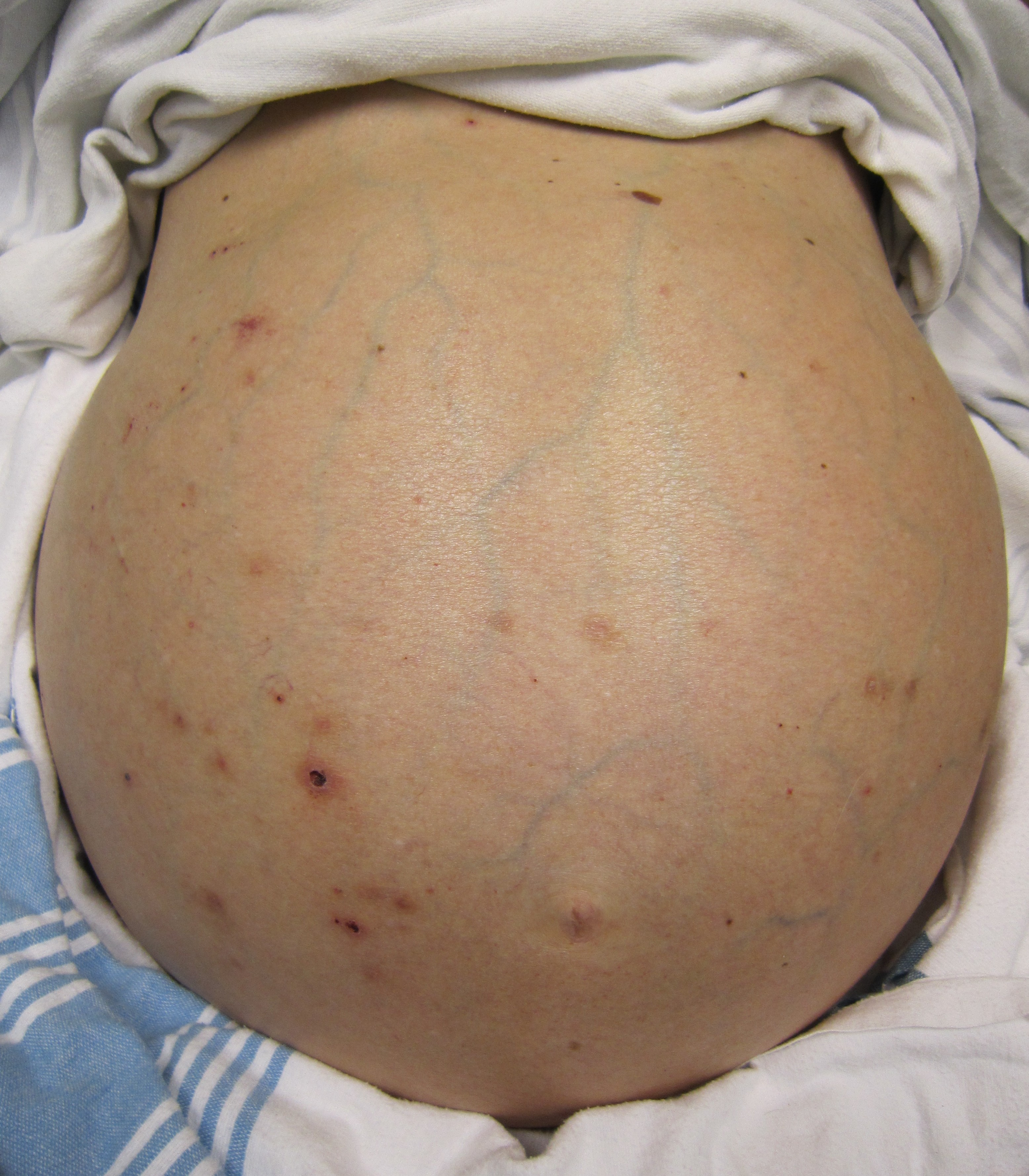
- Massive abdominal distension caused by liver cirrhosis leading to fluid buildup.
- Specialty: Gastroenterology
- Causes: a variety of causes; most commonly due to a build up of gas in the stomach, small intestine, or colon

Abdominal distension occurs when substances, such as air (gas) or fluid, accumulate in the abdomen causing its expansion. It is typically a symptom of an underlying disease or dysfunction in the body, rather than an illness in its own right. People with this condition often describe it as "feeling bloated". Affected people often experience a sensation of fullness, abdominal pressure, and sometimes nausea, pain, or cramping. In the most extreme cases, upward pressure on the diaphragm and lungs can also cause shortness of breath. Through a variety of causes (see below), bloating is most commonly due to a build up of gas in the stomach, small intestine, or colon. The pressure sensation is often relieved, or at least lessened, by belching or flatulence. Medications that settle gas in the stomach and intestines are also commonly used to treat the discomfort and lessen the abdominal distension.

== Causes ==
One of the causes of abnormal bloating is excessive eating and air swallowing, known as aerophagia. Other causes of bloating and distension include inflammatory bowel diseases such as Crohn's disease and ulcerative colitis, irritable bowel syndrome, diabetes, functional dyspepsia, or transient constipation. In rare cases, bloating may occur in individuals who have milk intolerance (lactose intolerance), parasite infections such as giardia, food poisoning (bacteria), celiac disease, severe peptic ulcer disease, bowel obstruction, or after certain types of abdominal surgery.

Heart failure and cirrhosis are also a common cause of distension. In both of these disorders, fluid accumulates in the abdomen and creates a sensation of fullness. Abdominal distension can also be a symptom of ovarian cancer. Women are more prone to bloating and often identify these symptoms during menstruation. Some individuals who develop distension may have either poor motility of their intestines or may be hypersensitive to gut sensations. Certain medications, such as antidepressants and anti-spasmodics, can contribute to reduced gut motility. Studies have shown that swallowing air during eating or delayed emptying of the stomach from hyperacidity leads to bloating after a meal. Individuals who are constipated also complain of bloating. In some individuals who are hypersensitive, any volume of air may be perceived as fullness and there may not be actual abdominal distension.

Abdominal distension (or "distended abdomen") can be a sign of many other conditions, including:

- Ascites
- Capillaria philippinensis
- Coccidiosis
- Cystic fibrosis
- Diverticulitis
- Eosinophilic gastroenteritis
- Fasciolosis
- Gastroparesis
- Giardiasis
- Hookworm disease
- Inflammatory bowel disease (Crohn's disease and ulcerative colitis)
- Kidney stones
- Kwashiorkor
- Lactose intolerance
- Obstructed bowel
- Ovarian cancer
- Polycystic liver disease
- Pregnancy
- Premenstrual syndrome
- Pseudomonas aeruginosa infection
- Small bowel bacterial overgrowth syndrome
- Strongyloidiasis
- Tropical sprue
- Weight gain
- Whipple's disease
- Anterior pelvic tilt (lower cross syndrome)

Persistent or recurrent bloating may be caused by intestinal parasites, infections, or other medical conditions.

== Diagnosis ==
The first step in diagnosis is to determine the etiology of abdominal distension. After making a differential diagnosis of abdominal distension, it is important to take a careful medical history.

Here are the most common causes of abdominal distension classified as an underlying cause and as a secondary disease.

As an underlying disease cause:

- Constipation
- Lactose intolerance and other food intolerances
- Overeating (due to overproduction of gases in the digestion process)

As a secondary disease cause:

- Celiac disease
- GERD (gastroesophageal reflux disease)
- Peptic ulcer disease
- Accumulation of fluid in the peritoneal cavity (e.g., ascites)

== Treatment ==
Bloating is not life-threatening. In most cases, bloating can be handled with simple home remedies and changes in lifestyle.

=== Foods ===
Certain foods have been known to worsen bloating. Poorly digested components of many foods are excreted into the large intestine where they are degraded by bacteria, producing excess gas. Depending on the undigested component, this may affect the odor and the volume of gas created.

Excess dietary fiber intake is a known cause of belching, gas and bloating. Many vegetables are known to cause bloating due to high levels of fiber and undigestible sugars such as raffinose (e.g., beans, cabbage, broccoli).

There are many individuals who are unable to tolerate dairy products because of lactose intolerance. Such foods should be eliminated from the diet if symptoms develop.

=== Medications ===
For some people, recurrent distension symptoms worsen their quality of life and thus many resort to health supplements or medications. Dietary supplements containing various enzymes, for example Beano, are formulated to help break down complex carbohydrates and vegetables in order to reduce substances in the gut that cause bacterial overgrowth and subsequent bloating. Though these enzymes can help reduce gas and belching, they may not always reduce bloating.

Other over-the-counter formulas recommended for bloating include simethicone and activated charcoal. Probiotics are also used to treat bloating based on the theory that improved gut flora will improve digestion and lessen gas generation.

== See also ==
- Gastric distension
