= Lung tumor =

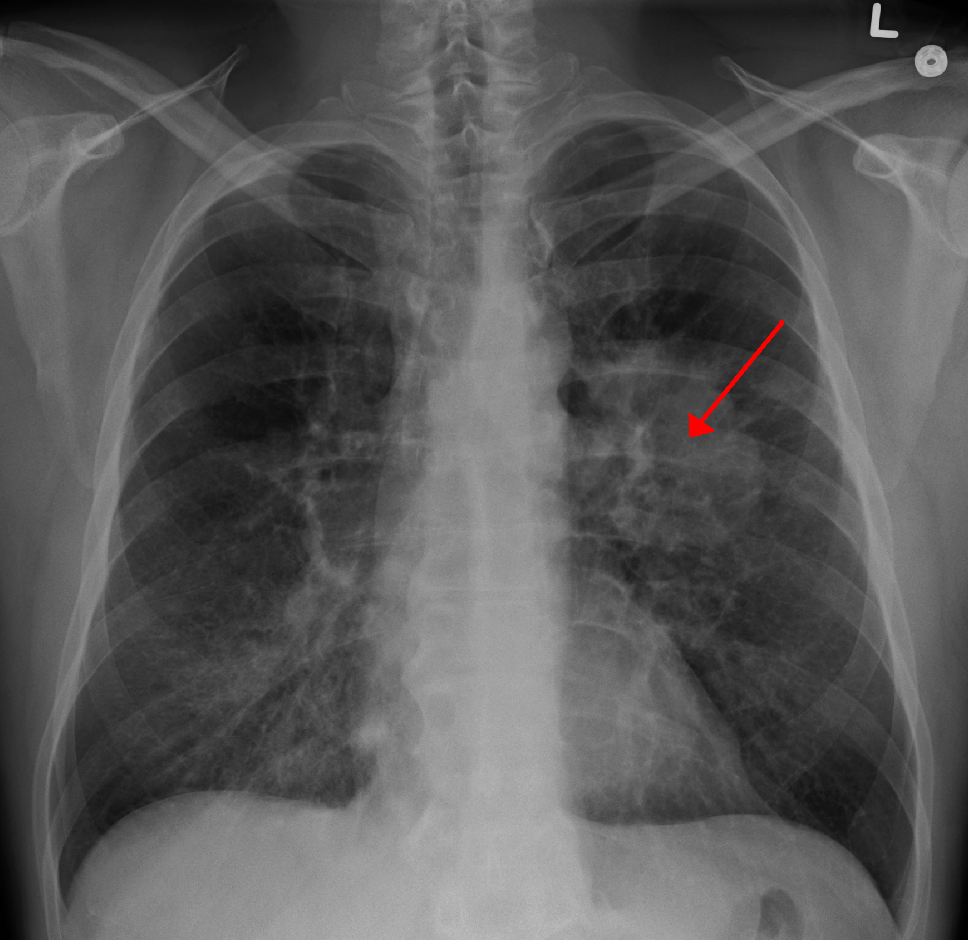
- A chest X-ray showing a tumor in the lung (marked by arrow)
- Specialty: Oncology, pulmonology
- Symptoms: Coughing (including coughing up blood), weight loss, shortness of breath, chest pains
- Complications: Lung cancer
- Causes: smoking, radon gas, asbestos, air pollution and genetics

Lung tumors are neoplastic lung nodules. These include:

Primary tumors of the lung/pulmonary system:

- Bronchial leiomyoma, a rare, benign tumor
- Lung cancer, the term commonly used to refer to carcinoma of the lung
- Pulmonary carcinoid tumor
- Pleuropulmonary blastoma
- Neuroendocrine tumors of the lung
- Lymphomas of the lung.
- Pulmonary sclerosing pneumocytoma, a rare benign tumor
- Sarcomas of the lung.
- Some rare vascular tumors of the lung

Non-lung tumors which may grow into the lungs:

- Mediastinal tumors
- Pleural tumors

Metastasis or secondary tumors/neoplasms with other origin:

- Metastasis to the lung

== See also ==
- Lung nodule
