= Onésime Delafond =

French veterinarian

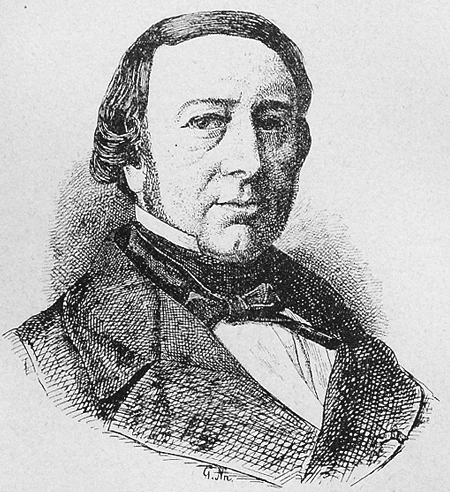
- Onésime Delafond (1805-1861)
- Born: 13 February 1805
- Died: 15 November 1861 (aged 56)
- Known for: Bacillus anthracis blood composition
- Scientific career
- Fields: veterinarian
- Workplaces: Maisons-Alfort veterinary school

Henri-Mamert-Onésime Delafond (13 February 1805 – 15 November 1861) was a French veterinarian born in Saint-Amand-en-Puisaye, Nièvre department. Delafond was one of the primary representatives of veterinary science in France during the first half of the nineteenth century.

He served as a professor and director of the Maisons-Alfort veterinary school. He was a member of the Académie de Médecine and of the Société nationale d'agriculture.

Delafond is remembered for pioneer microscopic research of Bacillus anthracis, the causative organism of anthrax. Also, with microbiologist David Gruby (1810–1898), he performed extensive investigations of Tritrichomonas suis, a parasite found in swine.

In 1842 with Gabriel Andral (1797–1876) and Jules Gavarret (1809–1890), he was co-author of an important treatise on domestic animal blood composition titled Recherches sur la composition du sang de quelques animaux domestiques, dans l’état de santé et de maladie. With Honoré Bourguignon, he published Traité pratique d'entomologie et de pathologie comparées de la psore ou gale de l'homme et des animaux domestiques (Treatise on the entomology and comparative pathology of scabies affecting humans and domesticated animals).
