= Knuckle sign =

Pattern seen during radiologic examination

Knuckle sign is a radiologic sign used for diagnosing pulmonary embolism. The presence of a blood clot in the branch of a pulmonary artery can resemble a knuckle in CT and X-ray images, which is why it is called knuckle sign. It is frequently seen along with other signs of pulmonary embolism, such as the Fleischner sign and Westermark sign.
