= Bronchial leiomyoma =

A bronchial leiomyoma is a relatively rare form of lung tumours. These tumours can form in the lower respiratory tract tissue of the bronchi, trachea and other lung tissue. They may also be derived from blood vessels. These tumors typically form from the smooth muscle tissue lining the bronchi. They grow as a solitary tumor attaching themselves to the sides of the bronchi.

== Diagnosis ==
This type of tumor can be mistaken for asthma or chronic pulmonary obstructive disease. The determination of a leiomyoma is done by chest x-rays, blood sample and taking a tissue sample of the tumor. An associated test is for tuberculosis, but the results are negative for this infection.

== Treatment ==
Surgical removal is the usual treatment to remove the tumor. A less invasive method of removing a small leiomyoma is through a bronchoscopy. Recovery is usually complete.

== Epidemiology ==
Bronchial leiomyomas are only 0.1% to 2% of benign lung tumours. Bronchial leiomyomas comprise 33–45% of respiratory system leiomyomas. People usually develop the tumor in middle age. These growths appear in men and women at the same rate.

== History ==
The first bronchial leiomyoma was described by in 1909.
