= Gavarret =

Gavarret is a surname of French origin.

== People ==
- Louis Denis Jules Gavarret, French scientist
- Hunaud de Gavarret, French abbott
- Pierre I. de Gavarret, bishop of the Ancient Diocese of Oloron

== Places ==
- Gavarret-sur-Aulouste

== See also ==
- Gave (placename element)
