= Epler =

Epler is a surname. Notable people with the surname include:

- Adam Epler (1891–1965), Polish Army officer
- Gary R. Epler, American pulmonologist
- Rain Epler (born 1977), Estonian politician
