= Hilum overlay sign =

Pattern seen in radiologic examinations

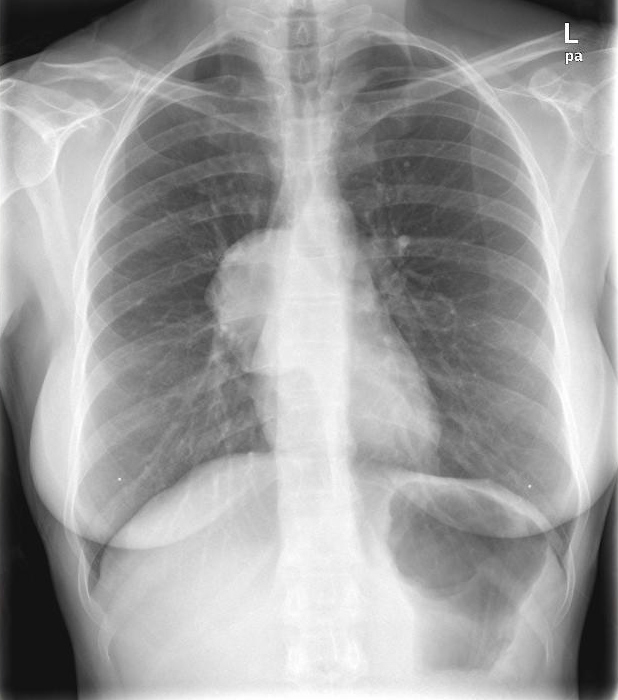
This PA chest radiograph demonstrates an abnormal contour in the right hilar region, with visualization of the pulmonary vessels through the mass (the hilar overlay sign) indicating its posterior mediastinal location. On resection this was found to be a benign solitary fibrous tumor of the pleura.

The hilum overlay sign is an imaging appearance on chest radiographs in which the outline of the hilum can be seen at the level of a mass or collection in the mid chest. It implies that the mass is not in the middle mediastinum, and is either from anterior or posterior mediastinum(most of the masses arise from the anterior mediastinum).

== See also ==
- Chest radiograph
- Human lung
- Mediastinum
- Radiology
- X-ray
