= Pulmonary sclerosing pneumocytoma =

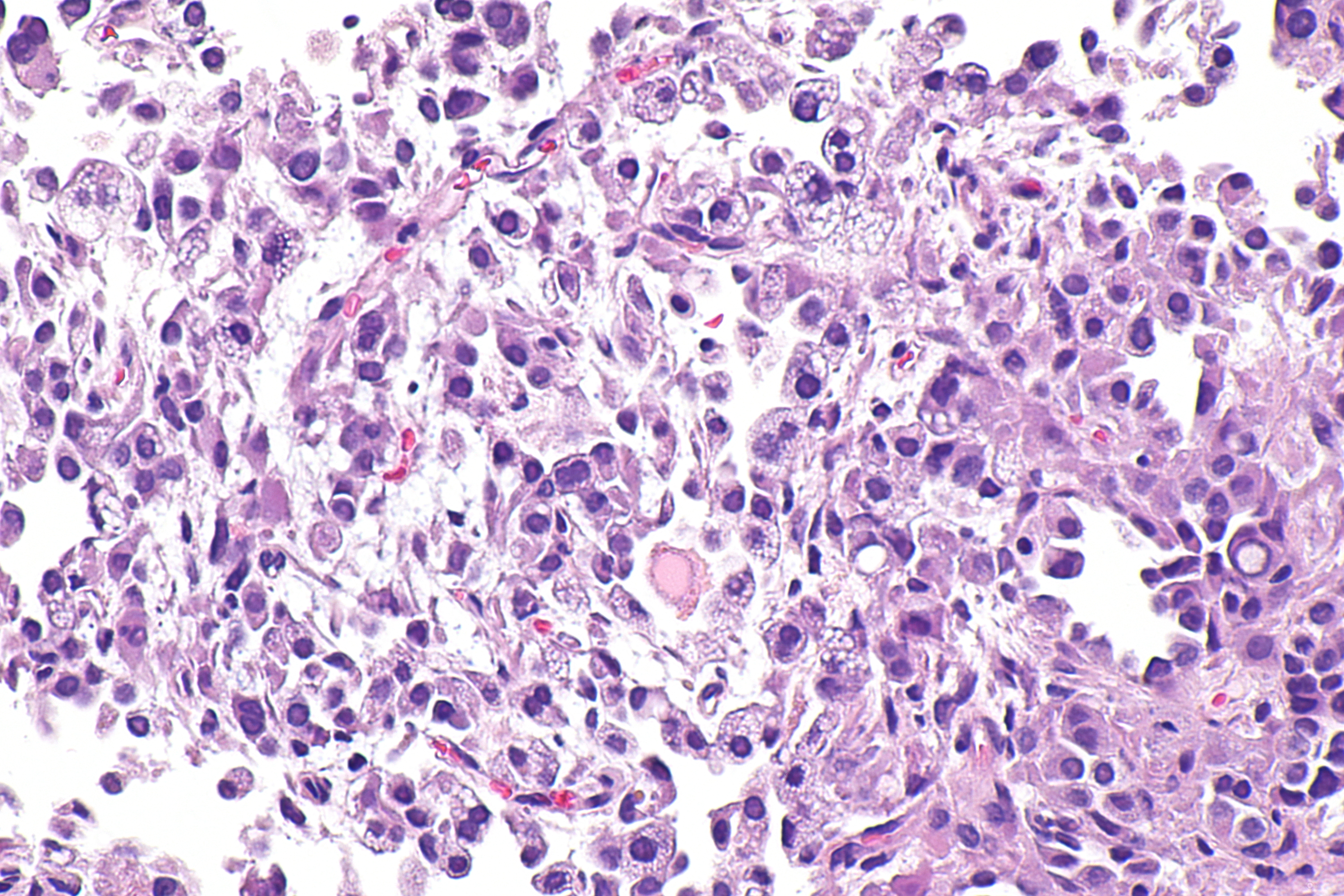
- Micrograph showing a pneumocytoma( Sclerosing pneumocytoma)
- Specialty: Pulmonology, oncology

Pulmonary sclerosing pneumocytoma is a rare benign tumour of the lung.

== Presentation ==
The most common presentation is as an incidental lesion noticed on a chest x-ray. These lesions are rarely symptomatic.

== Histology ==
These are solitary lesions lying within the lung varying in size between 10 and 80 millimeters in diameter.There are four elements in this tumour: solid, papillary, sclerotic and hemangiomatous. These are present in variable proportions depending on the lesion. Calcification occurs in 40%.

Although considered benign spread to regional lymph nodes occurs in <5%. The underlying causative cell type seems to be a type II pneumonocyte.

== Diagnosis ==
Diagnosis is normally made by thoracotomy and biopsy. The regional lymph nodes are normally removed as these may show evidence of spread.

Bronchoscopy is not usually useful as these lesions tend to lie in the perifery of the lung. Fine needle aspirates may be not be sufficient to make the diagnosis.

Blood tests are normal. CT shows a solitary nodule with may have some calcium present. PET scans may be positive.

== Treatment ==
If the diagnosis is made preoperatively radiation treatment may be an option.

== Prognosis ==
The prognosis is excellent with no evidence of recurrence. Long term follow up is recommended.

== Epidemiology ==
This tumour is rare - 1% cases of benign lung tumours. It is most common in Asian women and usually presents in the fifth decade of life. The male:female ratio is 1:5.

== History ==
This lesion was first described in 1956 by Liebow and Hubbell.
