= Lymphangitis =

Inflammation or infection of the lymphatic channels

- Other names: Inflamed lymph vessels
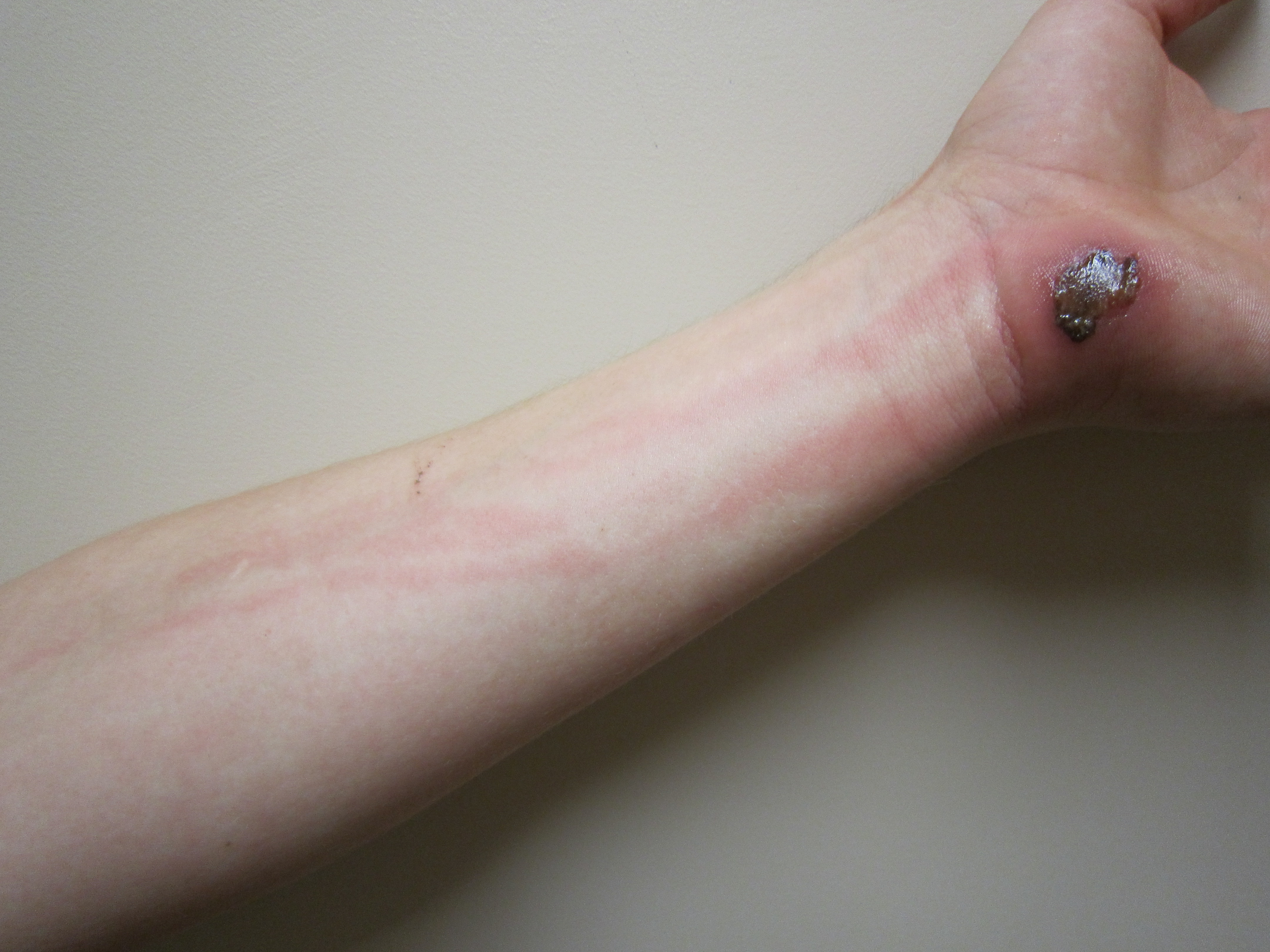
- Forearm lymphangitis due to cellulitis of the hand
- Specialty: Angiology

Lymphangitis is an inflammation or an infection of the lymphatic channels that occurs as a result of infection at a site distal to the channel. It may present as long red streaks spreading away from the site of infection. It is a possible medical emergency as involvement of the lymphatic system allows for an infection to spread rapidly. The most common cause of lymphangitis in humans is bacteria, in which case sepsis and death can result within hours if left untreated. The most commonly involved bacteria include Streptococcus pyogenes (Group A strep) and hemolytic streptococci. In some cases, it can also be caused by viruses such as mononucleosis or cytomegalovirus, by the fungus Sporothrix schenckii, or by specific conditions such as tuberculosis or syphilis. Other causes include arthropod bites and iatrogenesis. Lymphangitis is sometimes mistakenly called "blood poisoning." In reality, "blood poisoning" is synonymous with sepsis.

Lymphatic vessels are smaller than capillaries and tiny venules and are ubiquitous in the body. These vessels are fitted with valves to direct flow in only one direction. Fluid diffusing through the thin-walled small capillaries should be collected and the lymphatic system does just that: a fluid rich in protein, minerals, nutrients, and other substances useful for tissue growth. As well as essential nutrients, the lymphatic system can also transport or carry cancer cells, defective or damaged cells, and foreign bodies or organisms, including pathogens such as bacteria and viruses. The vessels of the lymphatic system all pass through lymph nodes, which function as filters for the lymph fluid before it is returned to the blood. The lymph nodes contain multiple types of white blood cells that, when activated, can engulf or metabolize pathogens and defective or cancerous cells, preventing infections and malignant cancer cells from spreading.

Infection spreads out of the wound site to enter the lymphatic system. The wound may be small; it may be an abscess constantly feeding bacteria into the lymphatic system. After infection, lymph nodes enlarge. Ear, skin, nose, and eye infections can spread into the lymphatic system. Red streaks in the skin along the direction of regional lymph nodes indicate lymphatic involvement. Infection may spread within hours and can cause sepsis and death.

== Symptoms and signs ==
Warm skin over site of infection. The person may also have chills and a high fever - between 38 and 40 degrees Celsius - along with moderate throbbing pain and swelling. The red streaks can be clearly outlined and demarcated or just barely visible, particularly in dark-skinned patients. Malaise, tenderness at the site of infection, skin ulcers (a rare symptom of lymphangitis), rapid pulse, and enlarged, swollen, and tender lymph nodes are also seen. Appetite loss has been documented with the presence of inflammation (inflammation-associated anorexia), but it is unclear whether appetite loss seen in patients with lymphangitis leads to weight loss; in cases that develop after lymphedema—which can be upwards of 8.14% of the time—weight gain has actually been documented.

If these symptoms are absent, it is suggestive of other underlying disorders such as tuberculosis, lymphoma, or Hodgkin's disease. A person with lymphangitis should be hospitalized and closely monitored by medical professionals. In very minor cases, regular application of antibiotic creams and cleanliness of the area can accelerate the healing process with no medical professional intervention or consultation required. When the inferior limbs are affected, the redness of the skin runs over the great saphenous vein location and can be confused for thrombophlebitis.

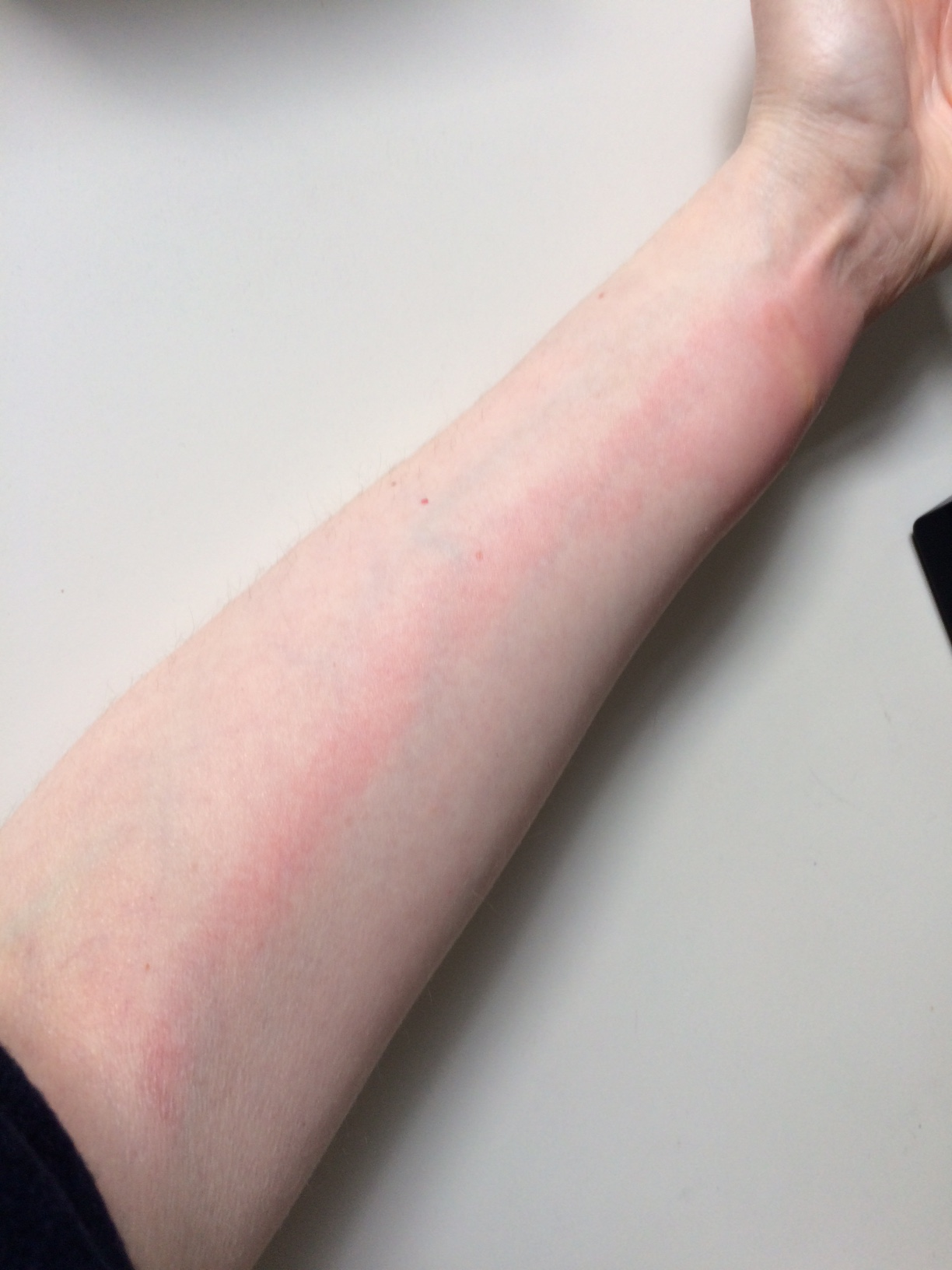
Lymphangitis resulting from bed bug bites

Chronic lymphangitis is a cutaneous condition that is the result of recurrent bouts of acute bacterial lymphangitis.

== Diagnosis ==
To detect and identify infectious agents such as streptococci and staphylococci bacterial strains blood tests and bacteria cultures can be used. Bacteria culture is suitable for identifying infectious agents in cases of severe lymphangitis that do not respond well to treatment.

=== Differential Diagnosis ===
Infectious lymphangitis should be differentiated from other conditions such as superficial thrombophlebitis (swelling is local to the affected vein), cat scratch (swellings feels hard to the touch), acute streptococcal hemolytic gangrene and necrotizing fasciitis (infected area crackles to the touch and the patient looks very ill).

== Treatment ==
Both drug and non-drug based treatment options are available to treat with lymphanginitis. The wound should be treated properly, dead tissues should be removed from the wound site, and pus drained. Applying heat to the affected lymph node using hot, moist compresses, or heating pads. Immobilizing and elevating the affected limb whenever it is possible, and administering analgesics to control pain.

If a local infection is invasive, immediate antibiotic drug therapy is required. Streptococci strains are the most common infectious agents and respond well to cephalosporins – cephalexin at a dose of 0.5 mg for between 7 and 10 days – or extended-spectrum penicillin. Methiciline-resistant staphylococcus aureus is common in communities and hence the need to use improved antibiotic drugs such as trimethoprim-sulfamethoxazole for 7 to 10 days. Naficillin, oxacillin, and dicloxacillin are also effective against infections of the lymphatic system.

== See also ==
- Lymphadenopathy
- Lymphangitis carcinomatosa
