= Chest radiograph =

Projection X-ray of the chest

- A normal posteroanterior (PA) chest radiograph of someone without any signs of injury. Dx and Sin stand for "right" and "left" respectively.
- Specialty: Radiology
- ICD-9-CM: 87.3-87.4
- MeSH: D013902
- MedlinePlus: 003804

A chest radiograph, chest X-ray (CXR), or chest film is a projection radiograph of the chest used to diagnose conditions affecting the chest, its contents, and nearby structures. Chest radiographs are the most common film taken in medicine.

Like all methods of radiography, chest radiography employs ionizing radiation in the form of X-rays to generate images of the chest. The mean radiation dose to an adult from a chest radiograph is around 0.02 mSv (2 mrem) for a front view (PA, or posteroanterior) and 0.08 mSv (8 mrem) for a side view (LL, or latero-lateral). Together, this corresponds to a background radiation equivalent time of about 10 days.

== Medical uses ==
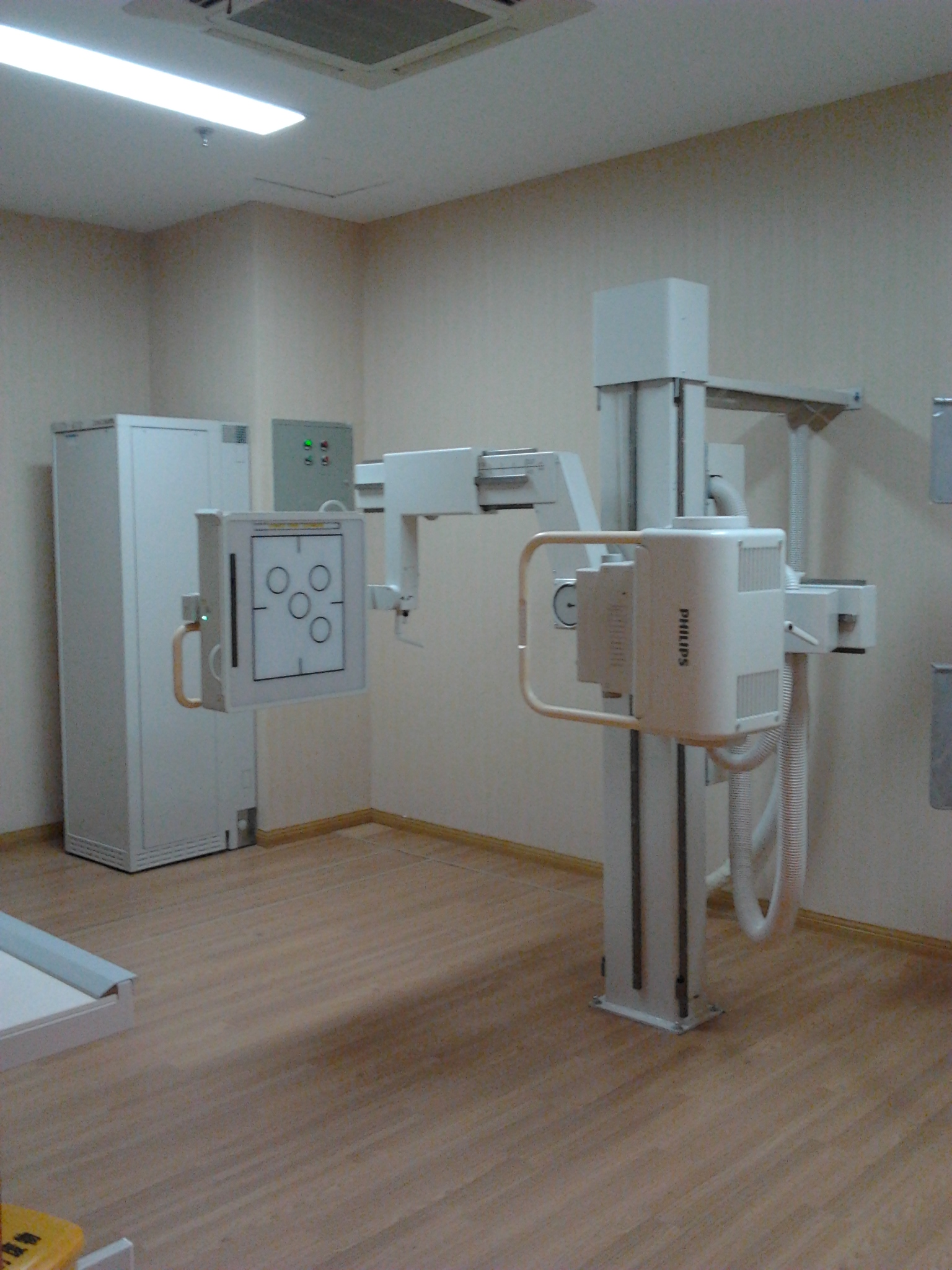
Dedicated chest radiography room

Conditions commonly identified by chest radiography

- Pneumonia
- Pneumothorax
- Interstitial lung disease
- Heart failure
- Bone fracture
- Hiatal hernia
- Pulmonary tuberculosis

Chest radiographs are used to diagnose many conditions involving the chest wall, including its bones, and also structures contained within the thoracic cavity including the lungs, heart, and great vessels. Pneumonia and congestive heart failure are very commonly diagnosed by chest radiograph. Chest radiographs are also used to screen for job-related lung disease in industries such as mining where workers are exposed to dust.

For some conditions of the chest, radiography is good for screening but poor for diagnosis. When a condition is suspected based on chest radiography, additional imaging of the chest can be obtained to definitively diagnose the condition or to provide evidence in favor of the diagnosis suggested by initial chest radiography. Unless a fractured rib is suspected of being displaced, and therefore likely to cause damage to the lungs and other tissue structures, x-ray of the chest is not necessary as it will not alter patient management.

The main regions where a chest X-ray may identify problems may be summarized as ABCDEF by their first letters:

- Airways, including hilar adenopathy or enlargement
- Breast shadows
- Bones, e.g. rib fractures and lytic bone lesions
- Cardiac silhouette, detecting cardiac enlargement
- Costophrenic angles, including pleural effusions
- Diaphragm, e.g. evidence of free air, indicative of perforation of an abdominal viscus
- Edges, e.g. apices for fibrosis, pneumothorax, pleural thickening or plaques
- Extrathoracic tissues
- Fields (lung parenchyma), being evidence of alveolar flooding
- Failure, e.g. alveolar air space disease with prominent vascularity with or without pleural effusions

== Views ==
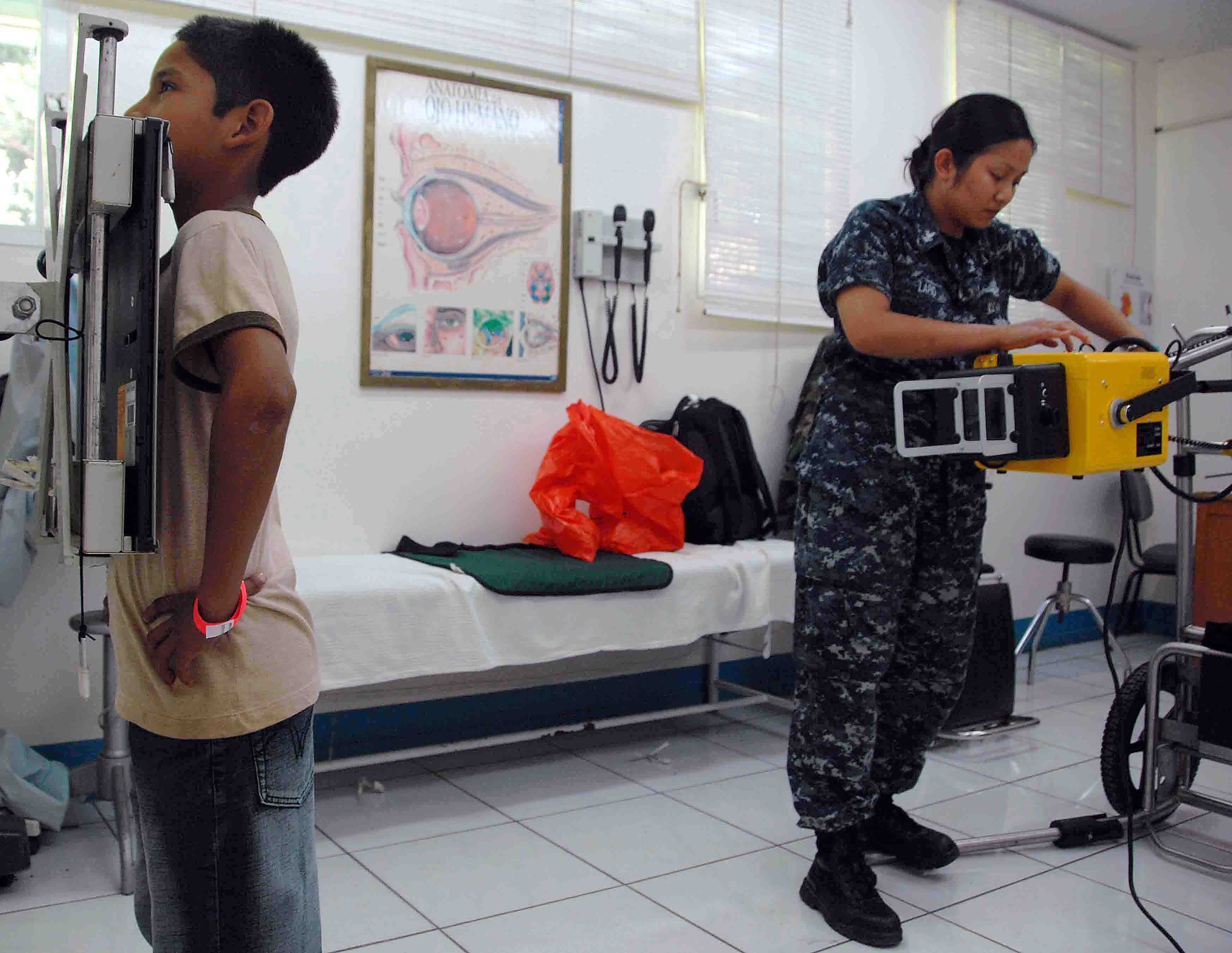
Positioning for a PA chest x-ray

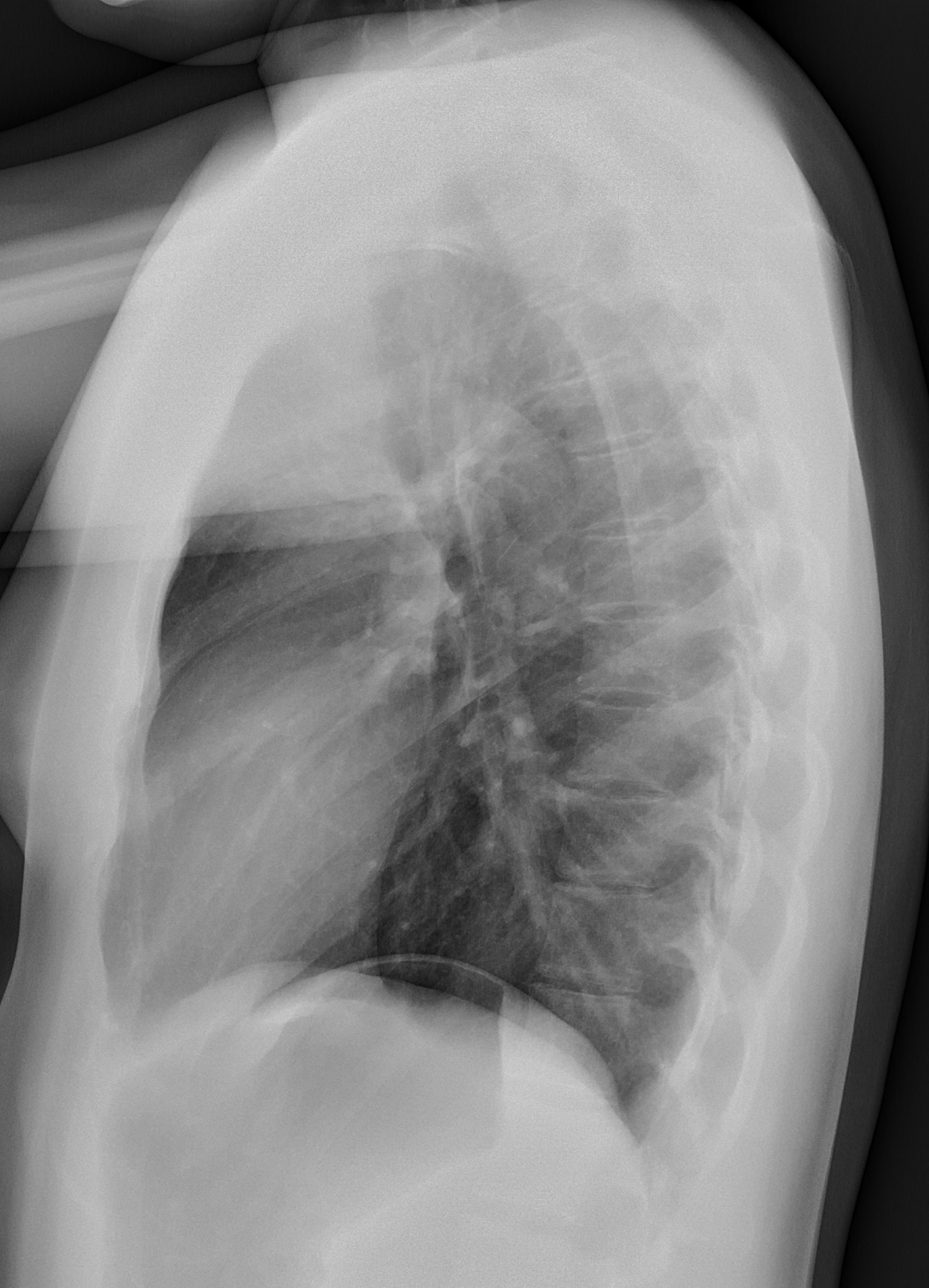
Normal lateral chest radiograph.

Different views (also known as projections) of the chest can be obtained by changing the relative orientation of the body and the direction of the x-ray beam. The most common views are posteroanterior, anteroposterior, and lateral. In a posteroanterior (PA) view, the x-ray source is positioned so that the x-ray beam enters through the posterior (back) aspect of the chest and exits out of the anterior (front) aspect, where the beam is detected. To obtain this view, the patient stands facing a flat surface behind which is an x-ray detector. A radiation source is positioned behind the patient at a standard distance (most often 6 feet, 1,8m), and the x-ray beam is fired toward the patient.

In anteroposterior (AP) views, the positions of the x-ray source and detector are reversed: the x-ray beam enters through the anterior aspect and exits through the posterior aspect of the chest. AP chest x-rays are harder to read than PA x-rays and are therefore generally reserved for situations where it is difficult for the patient to get an ordinary chest x-ray, such as when the patient is bedridden. In this situation, mobile X-ray equipment is used to obtain a lying down chest x-ray (known as a "supine film"). As a result, most supine films are also AP.

Lateral views of the chest are obtained in a similar fashion as the posteroanterior views, except in the lateral view, the patient stands with both arms raised and the left side of the chest pressed against a flat surface.

=== Typical views ===
Required projections can vary by country and hospital, although an erect posteroanterior (PA) projection is typically the first preference. If this is not possible, then an anteroposterior view will be taken. Further imaging depends on local protocols which is dependent on the hospital protocols, the availability of other imaging modalities and the preference of the image interpreter. In the UK, the standard chest radiography protocol is to take an erect posteroanterior view only and a lateral one only on request by a radiologist. In the US, chest radiography includes a PA and Lateral with the patient standing or sitting up. Special projections include an AP in cases where the image needs to be obtained stat (immediately) and with a portable device, particularly when a patient cannot be safely positioned upright. Lateral decubitus may be used for visualization of air-fluid levels if an upright image cannot be obtained. Anteroposterior (AP) Axial Lordotic projects the clavicles above the lung fields, allowing better visualization of the apices (which is extremely useful when looking for evidence of primary tuberculosis).

=== Additional views ===
- Decubitus – taken while the patient is lying down, typically on their side. Useful for differentiating pleural effusions from consolidation (e.g. pneumonia) and loculated effusions from free fluid in the pleural space. In effusions, the fluid layers out (by comparison to an up-right view, when it often accumulates in the costophrenic angles).
- Lordotic view – used to visualize the apex of the lung, to pick up abnormalities such as a Pancoast tumor.
- Expiratory view – helpful for the diagnosis of pneumothorax.
- Oblique view – useful for the visualization of the ribs and sternum. Although it is necessary to do the appropriate adaptations to the x-ray dosage to be used.

== Landmarks ==
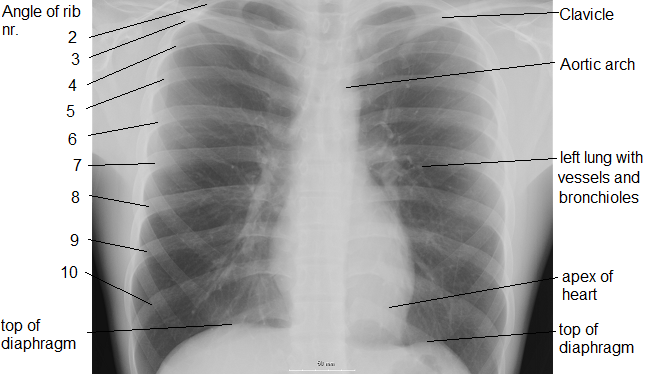
A chest radiograph with the angle parts of the ribs and some other landmarks labeled.

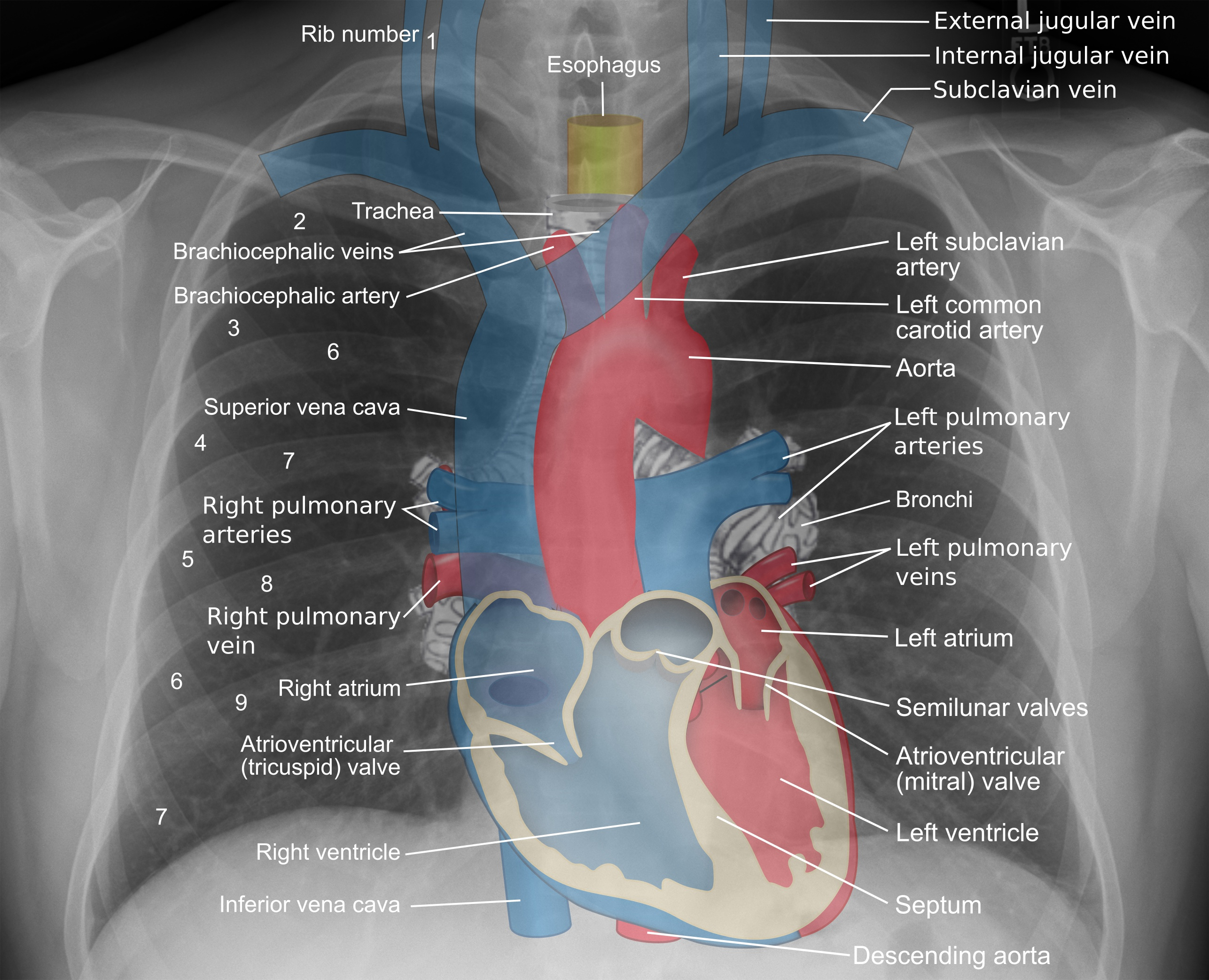
Mediastinal structures on a chest radiograph.

In the average person, the diaphragm should be intersected by the 5th to 7th anterior ribs at the mid-clavicular line, and 9 to 10 posterior ribs should be viewable on a normal PA inspiratory film. An increase in the number of viewable ribs implies hyperinflation, as can occur, for example, with obstructive lung disease or foreign body aspiration. A decrease implies hypoventilation, as can occur with restrictive lung disease, pleural effusions or atelectasis. Underexpansion can also cause interstitial markings due to parenchymal crowding, which can mimic the appearance of interstitial lung disease. Enlargement of the right descending pulmonary artery can indirectly reflect changes of pulmonary hypertension, with a size greater than 16 mm abnormal in men and 15 mm in women.

Appropriate penetration of the film can be assessed by faint visualization of the thoracic spines and lung markings behind the heart. The right diaphragm is usually higher than the left, with the liver being situated beneath it in the abdomen. The minor fissure can sometimes be seen on the right as a thin horizontal line at the level of the fifth or sixth rib. Splaying of the carina can also suggest a tumor or process in the middle mediastinum or enlargement of the left atrium, with a normal angle of approximately 60 degrees. The right paratracheal stripe is also important to assess, as it can reflect a process in the posterior mediastinum, in particular the spine or paraspinal soft tissues; normally it should measure 3 mm or less. The left paratracheal stripe is more variable and only seen in 25% of normal patients on posteroanterior views.

Localization of lesions or inflammatory and infectious processes can be difficult to discern on chest radiograph, but can be inferred by silhouetting and the hilum overlay sign with adjacent structures. If either hemidiaphragm is blurred, for example, this suggests the lesion to be from the corresponding lower lobe. If the right heart border is blurred, than the pathology is likely in the right middle lobe, though a cavum deformity can also blur the right heard border due to indentation of the adjacent sternum. If the left heart border is blurred, this implies a process at the lingula.

== Abnormalities ==
=== Nodule ===
A lung nodule is a discrete opacity in the lung which may be caused by:

- Neoplasm: benign or malignant
- Granuloma: tuberculosis
- Infection: round pneumonia
- Vascular: infarct, varix, granulomatosis with polyangiitis, rheumatoid arthritis

There are a number of features that are helpful in suggesting the diagnosis:

- rate of growth
  - Doubling time of less than one month: sarcoma/infection/infarction/vascular
  - Doubling time of six to 18 months: benign tumor/malignant granuloma
  - Doubling time of more than 24 months: benign nodule neoplasm
- calcification
- margin
  - smooth
  - lobulated
  - presence of a corona radiata
- shape
- site

If the nodules are multiple, the differential is then smaller:

- infection: tuberculosis, fungal infection, septic emboli
- neoplasm: e.g., metastases, lymphoma, hamartoma
- sarcoidosis
- alveolitis
- auto-immune disease: e.g., granulomatosis with polyangiitis, rheumatoid arthritis
- inhalation (e.g., pneumoconiosis)

=== Cavities ===
A cavity is a walled hollow structure within the lungs. Diagnosis is aided by noting:

- wall thickness
- wall outline
- changes in the surrounding lung

The causes include:

- cancer
- infarct (usually from a pulmonary embolus)
- infection: e.g., Staphylococcus aureus, tuberculosis, Gram negative bacteria (especially Klebsiella pneumoniae), anaerobic bacteria, and fungus
- Granulomatosis with polyangiitis

=== Pleural abnormalities ===
Fluid in space between the lung and the chest wall is termed a pleural effusion. There needs to be at least 75 mL of pleural fluid in order to blunt the costophrenic angle on the lateral chest radiograph and 200 mL of pleural fluid in order to blunt the costophrenic angle on the posteroanterior chest radiograph. On a lateral decubitus, amounts as small as 50ml of fluid are possible. Pleural effusions typically have a meniscus visible on an erect chest radiograph, but loculated effusions (as occur with an empyema) may have a lenticular shape (the fluid making an obtuse angle with the chest wall).

Pleural thickening may cause blunting of the costophrenic angle, but is distinguished from pleural fluid by the fact that it occurs as a linear shadow ascending vertically and clinging to the ribs.

=== Diffuse shadowing ===
The differential for diffuse shadowing is very broad and can defeat even the most experienced radiologist. It is seldom possible to reach a diagnosis on the basis of the chest radiograph alone: high-resolution CT of the chest is usually required and sometimes a lung biopsy. The following features are usually noted:

- type of shadowing (lines, dots or rings)
  - reticular (crisscrossing lines)
  - companion shadow (lines paralleling bony landmarks)
  - nodular (many small dots)
  - rings or cysts
  - ground glass
  - consolidation (diffuse opacity with air bronchograms)
- location (where is the lesion worst?)
  - upper (e.g., sarcoid, tuberculosis, silicosis/pneumoconiosis, ankylosing spondylitis, Langerhans cell histiocytosis)
  - lower (e.g., cryptogenic fibrosing alveolitis, connective tissue disease, asbestosis, drug reactions)
  - central (e.g., pulmonary edema, alveolar proteinosis, lymphoma, Kaposi's sarcoma, PCP)
  - peripheral (e.g., cryptogenic fibrosing alveolitis, connective tissue disease, chronic eosinophilic pneumonia, bronchiolitis obliterans organizing pneumonia)
- lung volume
  - increased (e.g., Langerhans cell histiocytosis, lymphangioleiomyomatosis, cystic fibrosis, allergic bronchopulmonary aspergillosis)
  - decreased (e.g., fibrotic lung disease, chronic sarcoidosis, chronic extrinsic allergic alveolitis)

Pleural effusions may occur with cancer, sarcoid, connective tissue diseases and lymphangioleiomyomatosis. The presence of a pleural effusion argues against pneumocystis pneumonia.

Reticular (linear) pattern
(sometimes called "reticulonodular" because of the appearance of nodules at the intersection of the lines, even though there are no true nodules present)
- idiopathic pulmonary fibrosis
- connective tissue disease
- sarcoidosis
- radiation fibrosis
- asbestosis
- lymphangitis carcinomatosa
- PCP

Nodular pattern
- sarcoidosis
- silicosis/pneumoconiosis
- extrinsic allergic alveolitis
- Langerhans cell histiocytosis
- lymphangitis carcinomatosa
- miliary tuberculosis
- metastases

Cystic
- cryptogenic fibrosing alveolitis (late stage "honeycomb lung")
- cystic bronchiectasis
- Langerhans cell histiocytosis
- lymphangioleiomyomatosis

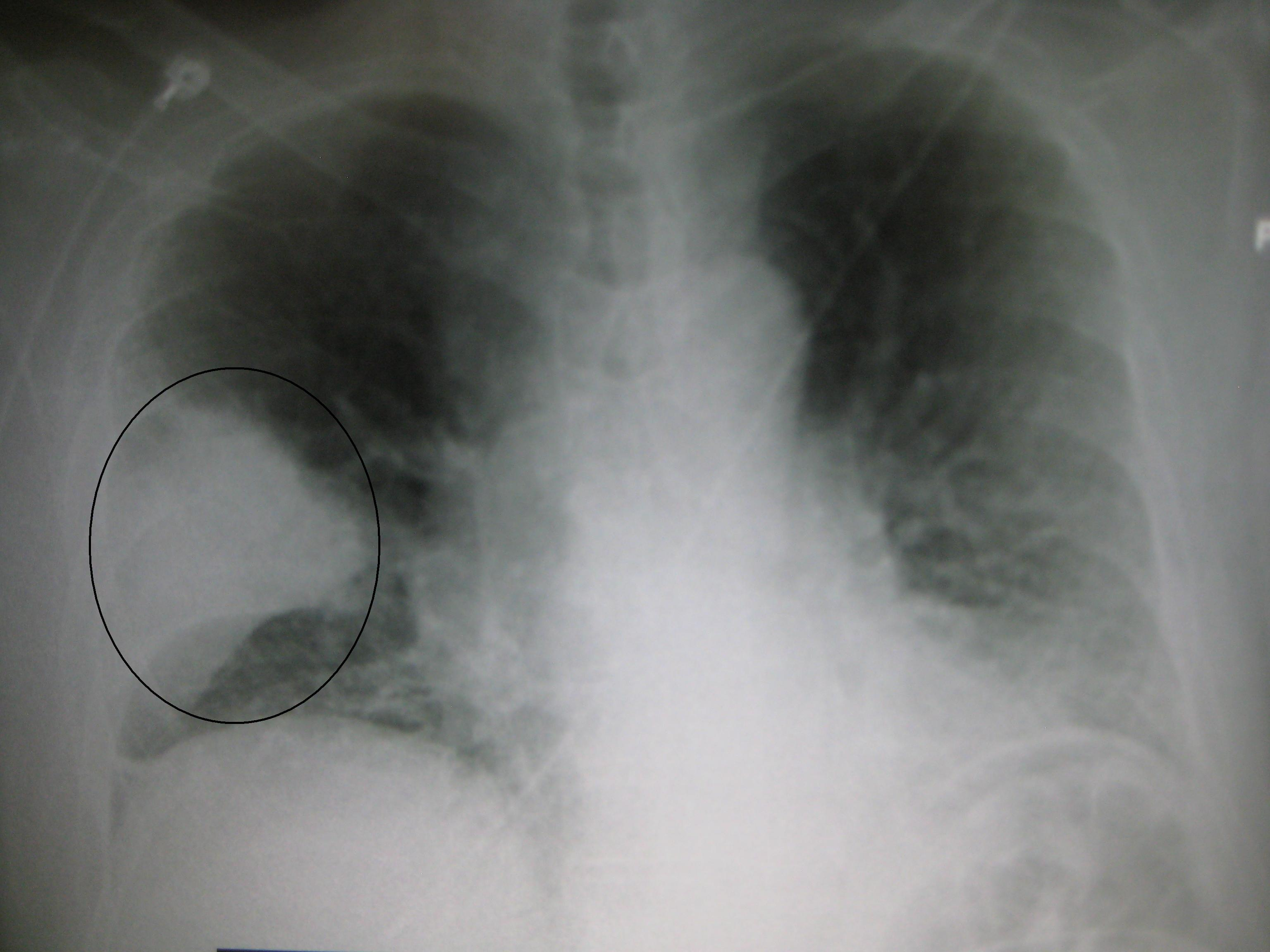
A chest X-ray showing a very prominent wedge-shape area of airspace consolidation in the right lung characteristic of acute bacterial lobar pneumonia.

Ground glass
- extrinsic allergic alveolitis
- desquamative interstitial pneumonia
- alveolar proteinosis
- infant respiratory distress syndrome (RDS)

Consolidation
- pneumonia
- alveolar haemorrhage
- alveolar cell carcinoma
- vasculitis

=== Signs ===
- The silhouette sign is especially helpful in localizing lung lesions. (e.g., loss of right heart border in right middle lobe pneumonia),
- The air bronchogram sign, where branching radiolucent columns of air corresponding to bronchi is seen, usually indicates air-space (alveolar) disease, as from blood, pus, mucus, cells, protein surrounding the air bronchograms. This is seen in Respiratory distress syndrome

== Disease mimics ==
Disease mimics are visual artifacts, normal anatomic structures or harmless variants that may simulate diseases and abnormalities.

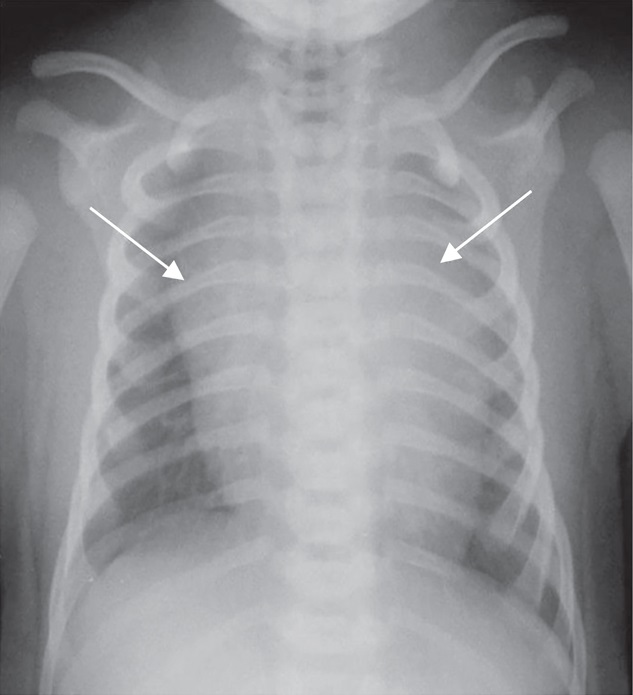
A prominent thymus, which can give the impression of a widened mediastinum.

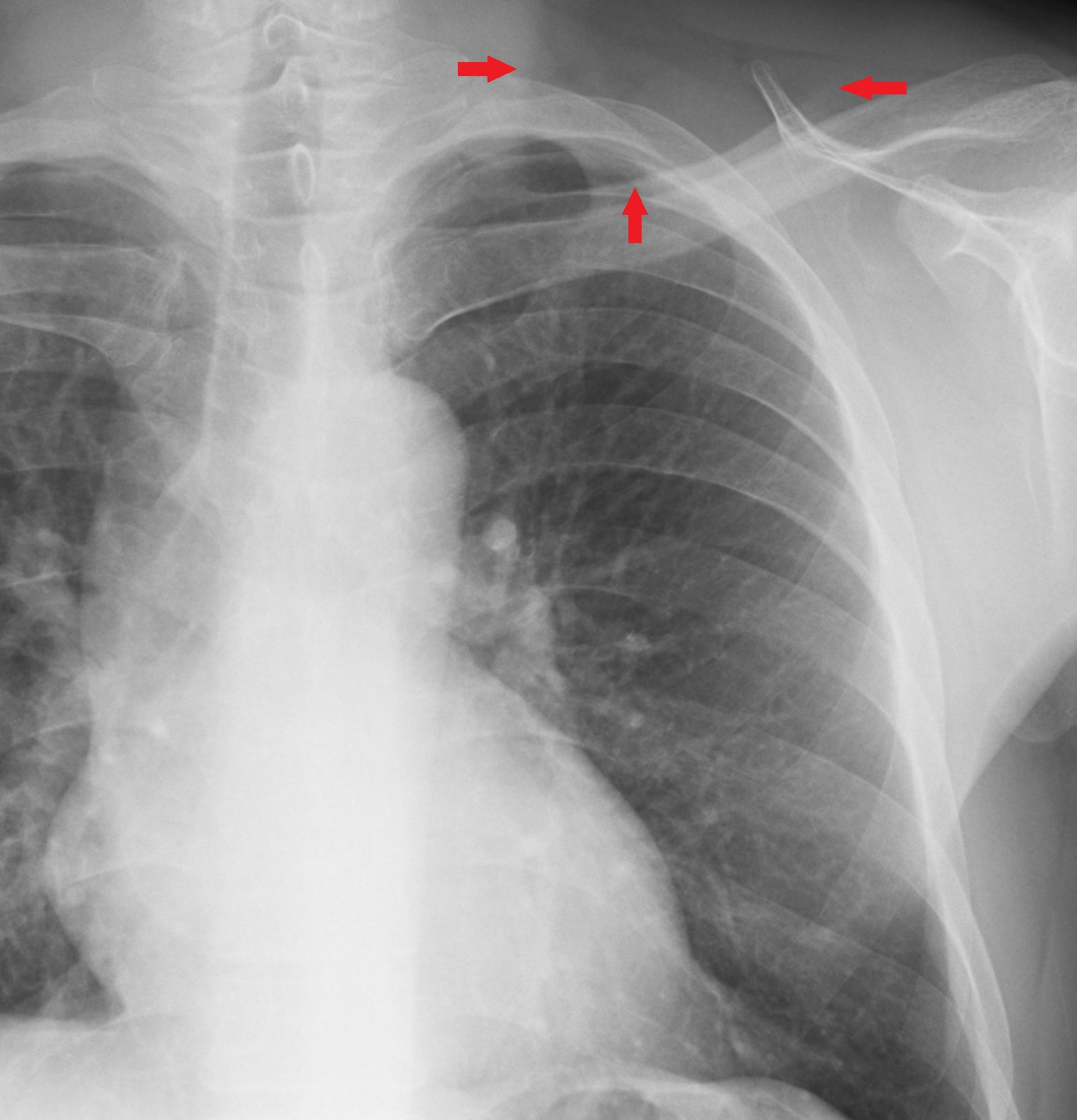
The inferior skin folds of the supraclavicular fossa may give the impression of a periosteal reaction of the clavicle

== Limitations ==
While chest radiographs are a relatively cheap and safe method of investigating diseases of the chest, there are a number of serious chest conditions that may be associated with a normal chest radiograph and other means of assessment may be necessary to make the diagnosis. For example, a patient with an acute myocardial infarction may have a completely normal chest radiograph.

== Gallery ==
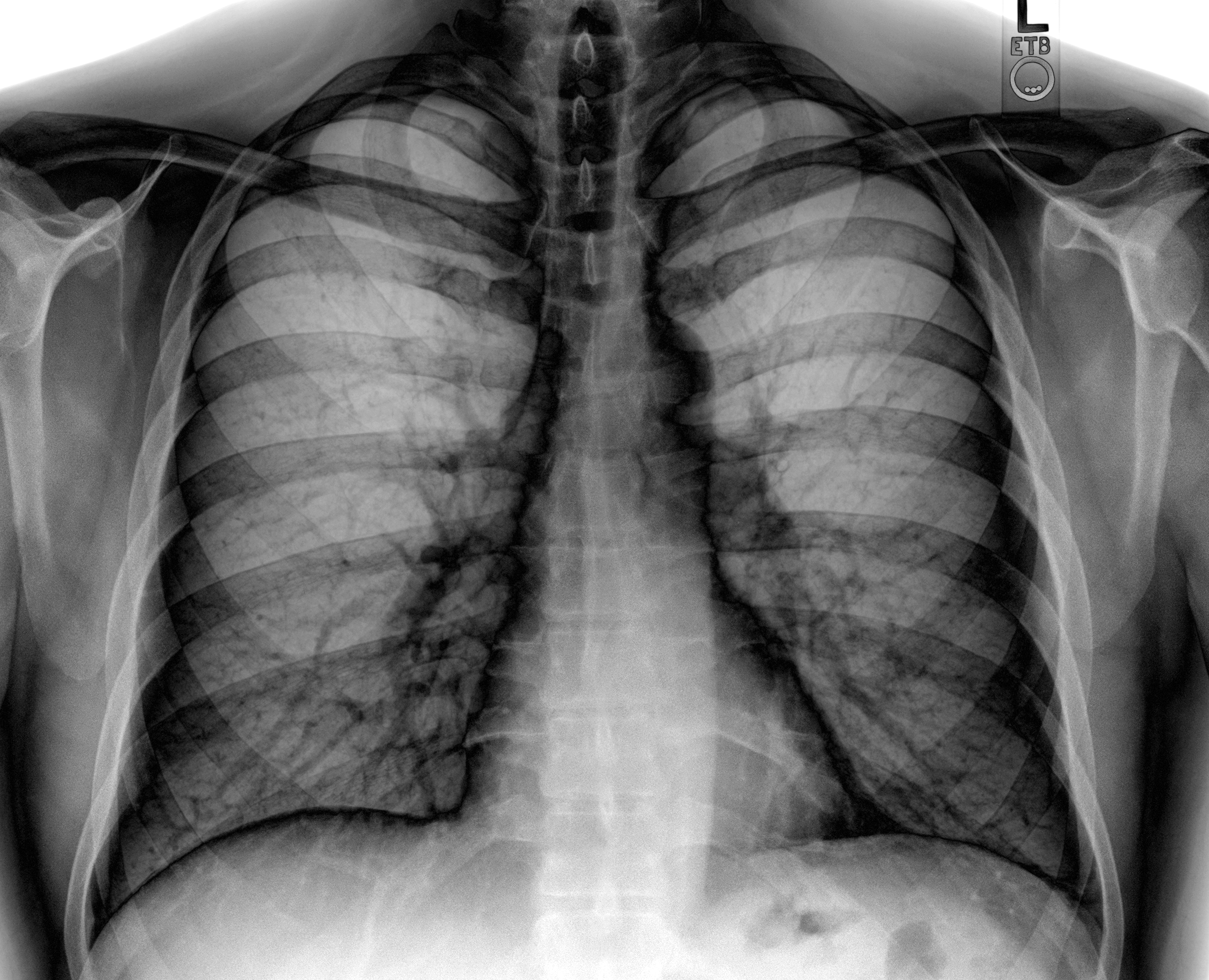
Chest X-ray PA inverted and enhanced.

Projectionally rendered CT scan, showing the transition of thoracic structures between the anteroposterior and lateral view

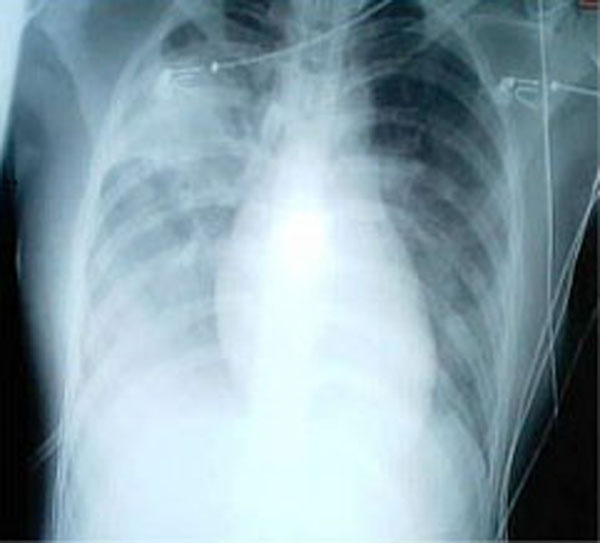
Chest film showing increased opacity in both lungs, indicative of pneumonia

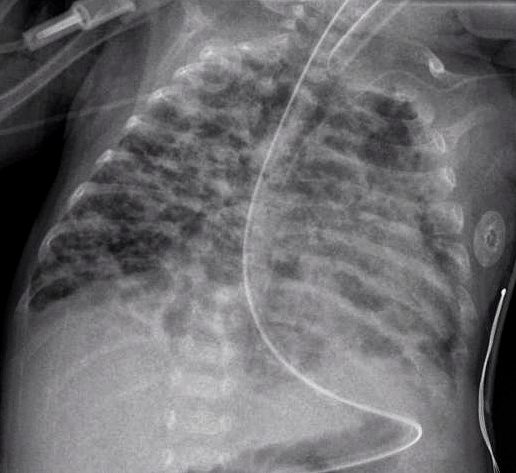
A chest radiograph showing bronchopulmonary dysplasia.

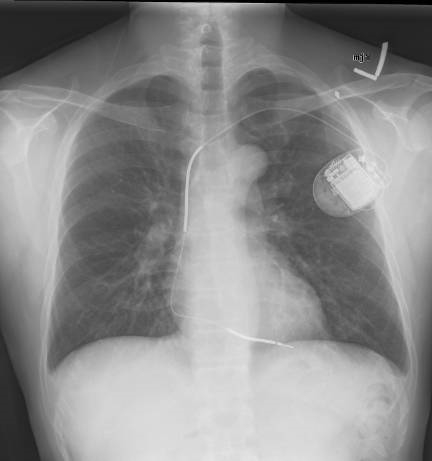
A chest film after insertion of an implantable cardioverter-defibrillator, showing the shock generator in the upper left chest and the electrical lead inside the right heart. Note both radio-opaque coils along the device lead.

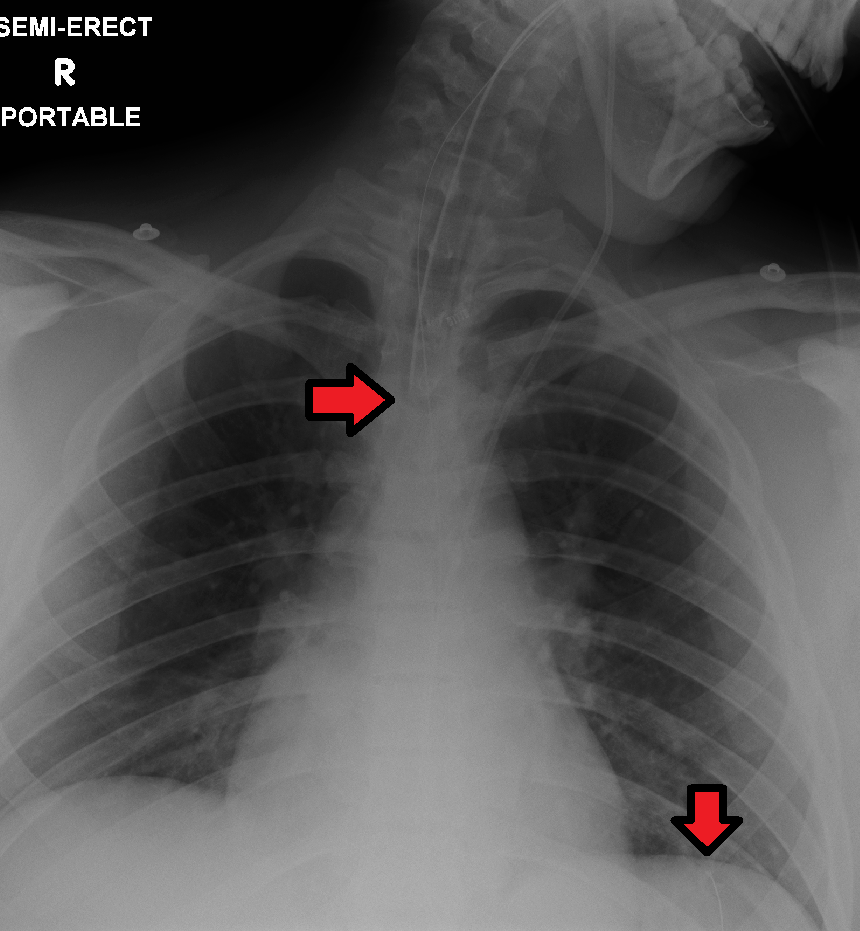
Portable chest (i.e., antero-posterior view) showing endotracheal tube and Levin tube, both properly in place.
