= Fleischner sign =

Pattern seen in radiologic examinations

Fleischner sign is a radiological sign that aids the diagnosis of pulmonary embolism. The sign indicates the dilatation of the proximal pulmonary arteries due to pulmonary embolism. It was named after Felix Fleischner, who first described it. The Fleishner sign is seen both on X-ray and CT scan of chest/thorax.
