= Alveolar lung disease =

- Alveolus
- Specialty: Pulmonology

Alveolar lung diseases, are a group of diseases that mainly affect the alveoli of the lungs.

== Causes ==
Alveoli are the functional units of the lungs. Alveolar lung diseases are classified as processes that affect these units ultimately lead to issues with ventilation. There are a number of different causes of insult to the alveoli including build up of fluid, hemorrhage, infection, malignancy and build up of protein and mineral deposits.

Conditions classified under alveolar lung disease include pulmonary edema (cardiogenic or non-cardiogenic), pneumonia (bacterial or viral), bronchoalveolar carcinoma, pulmonary hemorrhage, alveolar proteinosis and amyloidosis, and alveolar microlithiasis.

Alveolar lung disease may be divided into acute or chronic. Causes of acute alveolar lung disease include pulmonary edema (cardiogenic or neurogenic), pneumonia (bacterial or viral), systemic lupus erythematosus, bleeding in the lungs (e.g., Goodpasture syndrome), idiopathic pulmonary hemosiderosis, and granulomatosis with polyangiitis.

Chronic alveolar lung disease can be caused by pulmonary alveolar proteinosis, alveolar cell carcinoma, mineral oil pneumonia, sarcoidosis (alveolar form), lymphoma, tuberculosis, metastases, or desquamative interstitial pneumonia.

== Diagnosis ==
=== Initial evaluation and Testing ===
Patients with alveolar lung disease may have difficulty breathing and/or a cough which may be productive of sputum or blood.

A physician will listen to the patient's lungs to help determine if there is likely a lower lung disease. Depending on the type of alveolar lung disease, the listener may hear "crackles" that indicate an excess of fluid in the lungs or an absence of lung sounds in certain regions which may indicate poor ventilation due to consolidation of pus or fibrosis.

A pulse oximeter is a device that measures the amount of oxygen available in the blood. This is an important measurement in the evaluation of a patient with difficulty breathing with suspected alveolar lung disease.

=== Imaging ===
Chest x-ray is the initial imaging modality of choice for evaluation of potential alveolar lung disease. Bedside ultrasound may also be utilized. The absence of radiographic evidence early on in the course of the disease does not exclude alveolar disease.

The alveolar disease is visible on chest radiography as small, ill-defined nodules of homogeneous density centered on the acini or bronchioles. The nodules coalesce early in the course of the disease, such that the nodules may only be seen as soft fluffy edges in the periphery.

When the nodules are centered on the hilar regions, the chest x-ray may develop what is called the "butterfly," or "batwing" appearance. The nodules may also have a segmental or lobar distribution. Air alveolograms and air bronchograms can also be seen which indicate fluid in the alveoli with air in the terminal bronchioles indicating the disease is alveolar.

These findings appear soon after the onset of symptoms and change rapidly thereafter.

A segmental or lobar pattern may be apparent after aspiration pneumonia, atelectasis, lung contusion, localized pulmonary edema, obstructive pneumonia, pneumonia, pulmonary embolism with infarction, or tuberculosis.

== Management ==
The two focuses of management for alveolar disease is supportive care to maintain oxygenation and ventilation to ensure that adequate oxygen is being delivered to blood, and to treat the underlying insult to the alveoli.

=== Supportive Care ===
Maintaining oxygenation and ventilation in alveolar lung disease is achieved through a number of methods. The mechanism of these treatments is primarily to provide oxygen and keep the alveoli open so that they can take up oxygen and deliver it to the bloodstream. Ventilatory support is recognized as an essential component in treating pulmonary edema and acute respiratory distress syndrome.

Non-invasive ventilation is the first step for patients who require ventilatory support. This can take the form of oxygen delivered via nasal cannula or non-rebreather mask. Patients who require additional support may be given a high-flow nasal cannula which has the added function of providing positive pressure on the alveoli, can warm and humidify air and decrease the required inspiratory effort of the patient. BiPAP and CPAP can also be used as next level treatment. Finally, intubation with ventilator support can be used with positive pressure to improve ventilation and oxygenation.

In cases where methods to support the lungs to provide oxygen to the blood fail, extracorporeal membrane oxygenation, or ECMO can be considered.

=== Treating underlying causes ===
Treating underlying causes of damage to alveoli is also essential in most alveolar lung diseases.

Some more commonly seen instances of alveolar lung disease include pulmonary edema and pneumonia.

For pulmonary edema, medical treatment in addition to measures to maintain ventilation includes diuretics to remove excess fluid from the lungs. Presumed bacterial pneumonia is typically treated with antibiotics.
