= Gabriel Andral =

French pathologist and professor

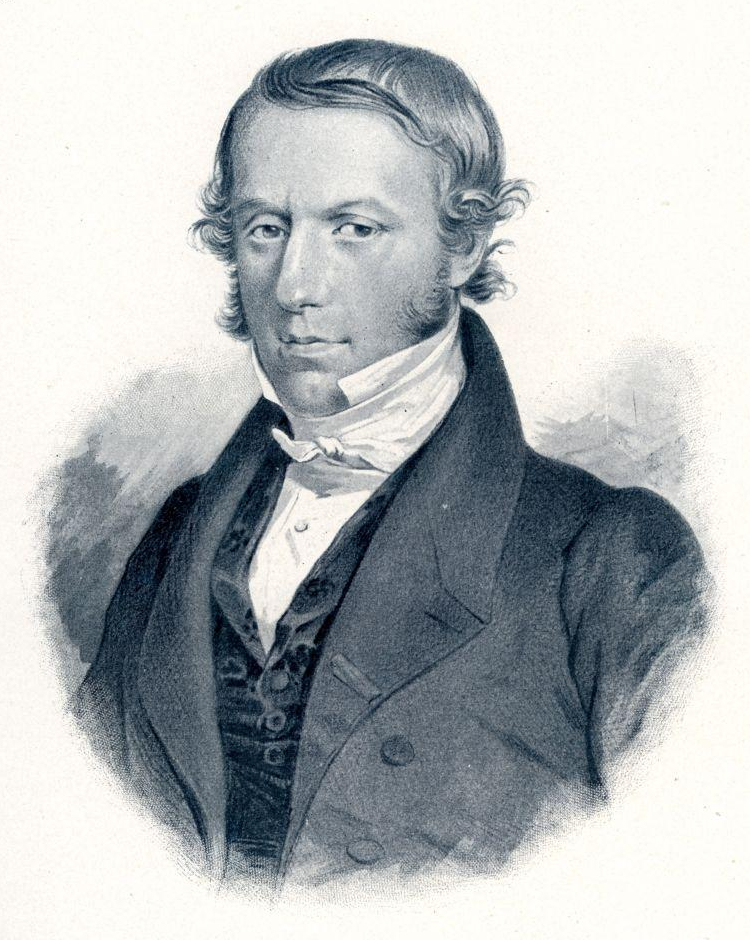
Gabriel Andral

Gabriel Andral (6 November 1797 – 13 February 1876) was a French pathologist and a professor at the University of Paris.

== Early life ==
Born in Paris in 1797 to a family, originally from Espédaillac, deeply rooted in the medical profession. His grandfather, father, and uncle were all physicians. His father, Guillaume Andral (1769–1853), held an honorary membership in the Academy of Medicine and had a career as a surgeon in the French Revolutionary Armies.

Gabriel Andral completed his secondary education at the prestigious Lycée Louis-le-Grand in Paris in 1813. Gabriel embarked on his medical studies in 1815, marking the beginning of his journey in the field of medicine.

== Career ==
In 1828 Andral was appointed professor of hygiene, and in 1839 succeeded François-Joseph-Victor Broussais (1772–1838) as chair of general pathology and therapy, a position he held for 27 years. In 1823 he became a member of the Académie Nationale de Médecine. He was elected a Foreign Honorary Member of the American Academy of Arts and Sciences in 1849.

Andral is remembered for his pioneer investigations of blood chemistry. He is considered to be the founder of scientific hematology, and is credited with its integration into clinical and analytical medicine. With his colleague, Louis Denis Jules Gavarret (1809–1890), he performed extensive studies of blood composition. They demonstrated that blood composition varies in different pathological conditions, and their findings showed the importance of blood chemistry as a means of confirming diagnoses.

Andral's crowning written achievement was Clinique médicale, a five-volume work that discussed almost every facet of medicine known at the time. It was an exhaustive summary of French medicine and its development in the early part of the 19th century.

Andral is credited as the first physician to describe lymphangitis carcinomatosa, a disease that is usually associated with cancers of the lung, breast, stomach, and cervix. His father, Guillaume Andral, was also a physician of note.

== Selected works ==
- Précis d'anatomie pathologique, (1829)
- Projet d'un essai sur la vitalité, (1835)
- An edition of Lænnec's Traité de l'auscultation médiate ou traité du diagnostic des poumons et du cœur (1836)
- Cours de pathologie interne (1836–1837)
- Sur le traitement de la fièvre typhoïde par les purgatifs (1837)
- Sur les modifications de properties de quelques principes du sang (fibrine, globules, materiaux solides du sérum, et eau) dans les maladies, (with Jules Gavarret); (1840)
- Recherches sur la composition du sang de quelques animaux domestiques, dans l’état de santé et de maladie, (with Jules Gavarret and Onésime Delafond 1805–1861); (1842)
- Traité élémentaire de pathologie et de thérapeutique générale (1843)
- Essai d'hématologie pathologique, (1843)

See also a more comprehensive list here.

== Terms ==
- Andral's decubitus—decubitus on the sound side; a position assumed in the early stages of pleurisy.

(Dorland's Medical Dictionary—1938)
