= Lymphangitis carcinomatosa =

Lymph vessel inflammation in cancer

Lymphangitis carcinomatosa is inflammation of the lymph vessels (lymphangitis) caused by a malignancy. Breast, lung, stomach, pancreas, and prostate cancers are the most common tumors that result in lymphangitis. Lymphangitis carcinomatosa was first described by pathologist Gabriel Andral in 1829 in a patient with uterine cancer. Lymphangitis carcinomatosa may show the presence of Kerley B lines on chest X-ray.

Lymphangitis carcinomatosa most often affects people 40–49 years of age.

Lymphangitis carcinomatosa may be caused by the following malignancies as suggested by the mnemonic: "Certain Cancers Spread By Plugging The Lymphatics" (cervical cancer, colon cancer, stomach cancer, breast cancer/bronchiogenic carcinoma, pancreatic cancer, thyroid cancer, laryngeal cancer)

== Pathology ==
In most cases, lymphangitis carcinomatosis is caused by the dissemination of a tumor with its cells along the lymphatics. However, in about 20 percent of cases, the inflammation of the lymphatic tubules (lymphangitis) is caused by a tumor that blocks the drainage of the lymph duct. In the lung, this is often caused by a centrally located mass, near the hilum of the lung that blocks lymphatic drainage.

== Prognosis ==
Previously, the finding of lymphangitis carcinomatosis meant about a six-month life expectancy. However, improved treatment has improved survival in patients with lymphangitis carcinomatosis, with patients often surviving three or more years with treatment.

== History ==
Lymphangitis carcinomatosa was first described by pathologist Gabriel Andral in 1829 in a patient with uterine cancer.

== See also ==
- Lymphangitis
