= Fleischner Society =

Medical society for thoracic radiology

The Fleischner Society is an international, multidisciplinary medical society for thoracic radiology, dedicated to the diagnosis and treatment of diseases of the chest. Founded in 1969 by eight radiologists whose predominant professional interests were imaging of chest diseases, the society was named in memory of Felix Fleischner, an inspiring educator, clinician, and researcher who made many contributions to the field of chest radiology. The society has had an active membership of approximately 65 members throughout its existence as well as approximately 35 senior members, who have retired from active medical practice or work in medical science after years of active membership in the society.

The Fleischner Society maintains a diverse membership that includes experts in adult and pediatric radiology, pathology, adult and pediatric pulmonary medicine, thoracic surgery, physiology, morphology, epidemiology and other related sciences. The diverse membership supports a primary role of the society, which is the publication of Fleischner Position Papers, which represent consensus documents that focus on controversial topics.

Recent Fleischner Position Papers include:

- Hansell; et al. (2008). "Fleischner Society: Glossary of Terms for Thoracic Imaging". Radiology. 246 (3): 697–722. doi:10.1148/radiol.2462070712. PMID 18195376.
- Management of suspected acute pulmonary embolism in the era of CT angiography: a statement from the Fleischner Society, published in Radiology
- Guidelines for management of small pulmonary nodules detected on CT scans: a statement from the Fleischner Society, published in Radiology

The Fleischner Society meets annually for scientific sessions where the latest advances in chest disease diagnosis and treatment are presented and discussed. While the preparation of Fleischner Position Papers is a year-round activity, the annual meeting serves as an important touch point for discussion and consensus around the topics.

The society is governed by an executive committee, composed of the president, president-elect, secretary, treasurer, chairman of academic development and past-president. In 2011–2012, the president of the society is Geoffrey D Rubin, MD. from Duke University.

The society is managed through the American College of Radiology in Reston, Virginia, U.S.
