= Gary R. Epler =

Professor in Harvard Medical college

Dr. Gary Epler
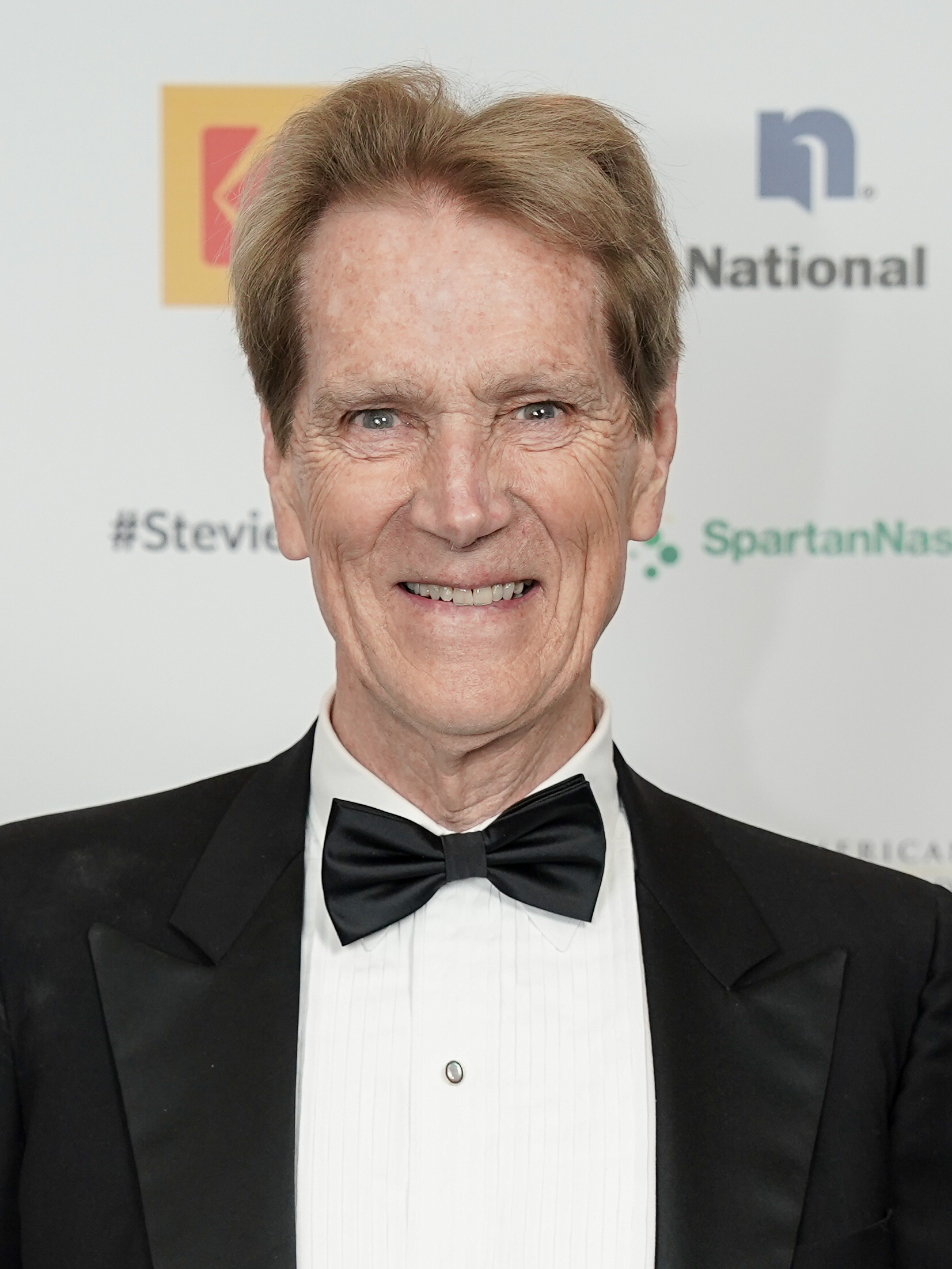
- Epler in 2024
- Born: Chico, California, USA
- Education: Tulane University School of Medicine (MD); Harvard University School of Public Health (MPH)
- Known for: Discovery of Bronchiolitis Obliterans Organizing Pneumonia and Eplerian Philosophy
- Scientific career
- Institutions: Harvard Medical School
- Website: www.eplerhealth.com

Gary Epler is an Associate Professor of Medicine at Harvard Medical School, author, and speaker.

== Education ==
Epler entered Tulane University School of Medicine in 1967 where he was a class officer and president of the Student American Medical Association (SAMA). During his second year, he established an evening clinic in New Orleans 9th Ward. He did his internal medicine internship at Harlem Hospital in New York City. From 1972 to 1974, he served in the United States Public Health Service in the Tuberculosis Branch as a Lieutenant Commander medical officer stationed in Hawaii; National Institutes of Health in Bethesda, Maryland. Epler was the Indian Health Service physician at Eagle Butte, South Dakota and the Area Project Director of a Nutritional Study in Upper Volta, Africa. He completed his internal medicine residency and pulmonary fellowship at the University Hospital in Boston, Massachusetts in 1978. He is board certified in Internal Medicine and Pulmonary Medicine.

== Professional and academic career ==
Epler was an Associate Clinical Professor at Boston University and has been an Associate Clinical Professor at Harvard Medicinal School since 1998. He was Visiting Professor at Kyoto University School of Medicine in Kyoto, Japan. He was the team pulmonary physician for the Boston Celtics NBA basketball team. He was the Course Director for a NIOSH Industrial Spirometry Program. He was a consultant for the Social Security Administration (SSA) Disability Panel in Baltimore, Maryland. He was Editor-in-Chief of the Pulmonary and Critical Care Update Program for the American College of Chest Physicians. He was an editorial review for the New England Journal of Medicine, Journal of the American Medical Association (JAMA), American Journal of Epidemiology, and the Annals of Internal Medicine. He was the President of the Massachusetts Thoracic Society and the President of the New England American College of Chest Physicians.

He is the author of the “You’re the Boss” series and A Medical Doctor’s Guide to Live Your Best Life”.

He was Chairman, Department of Medicine at the New England Baptist Hospital from 1983 to 1998 where he was a Board Member, Medical Executive Committee member, credential committee member and Chairman of the Clinical Investigation Committee.

He lives in the Boston area with his wife, Joan.

== Research and career ==
Dr. Gary Epler did research on the Bronchiolitis Obliterans Organizing Pneumonia which is inflammatory bronchiolitis obliterans with patchy organizing pneumonia and may be referred to as Epler’s pneumonia.

== Books ==
- Diseases of the Bronchioles (1994).
- Clinics in Chest Medicine (1992).
- You’re the Boss: Manage Your Disease
- BOOP: You’re the Boss.
- Good Thoughts Podcast.
- Asthma: You’re the Boss.
- Food: You’re the Boss.
- Ignite Your Life.
- Fuel For life Level-10 Energy
- Alive with Life
