= Felix Fleischner =

Austrian-American radiologist

Felix G. Fleischner (July 29, 1893 in Vienna – August 1969) was an Austrian-American radiologist from Boston. The Fleischner Society for thoracic imaging and diagnosis is named after him.

== Biography ==
Felix Fleischner was born in Vienna. He became an expert in the field of radiology, and most of his work centered on the chest x-ray. He served as professor and head of radiology of the Second Medical Clinic of the University of Vienna.

Being of Jewish ethnicity, Fleischner moved to Boston after Austria was annexed by Germany in 1938. He worked at Massachusetts General Hospital and then became the first full-time radiologist at the Beth Israel Deaconess Medical Center in Boston in 1942. He was a faculty member at the Harvard Medical School. Fleischner published 251 scientific papers in his lifetime; he published 164 of them after moving to the United States.

Fleischner died of a heart attack while he was swimming in August 1969.

== Fleischner Society ==
Before his death, Fleischner had been invited to a meeting of radiologists to be held in November 1969. The group's focus was to be the study of the radiology of the chest. When the group met, they named themselves the Fleischner Society. As of 2010, the society had 65 active members and 35 additional senior members.
