= Silhouette sign =

Radiologic sign

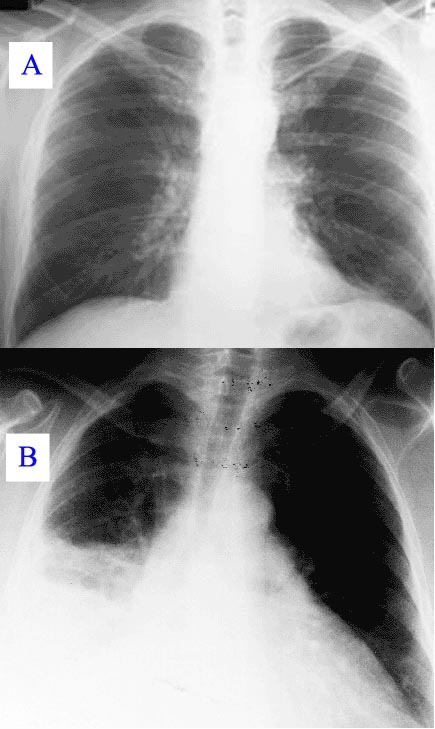
- A) Normal chest radiograph; B) Q fever pneumonia affecting the right lower and middle lobes. Note the loss of the normal radiographic silhouette (contour) between the affected lung and its right heart border as well as between the affected lung and its right diaphragm border. This phenomenon is called the silhouette sign
- Differential diagnosis: right middle lobe syndrome

In radiology, the silhouette sign refers to the loss of normal borders between thoracic structures. It is usually caused by an intrathoracic radiopaque mass that touches the border of the heart or aorta. In other words, it is difficult to make out the borders of a particular structure - normal or otherwise - because it is next to another dense structure, both of which will appear white on a standard X-ray. It may occur, for example, in right middle lobe syndrome, where the right heart margin is obscured, and in right lower lobe pneumonia, where the border of the diaphragm on the right side is obscured, while the right heart margin remains distinct. Silhouette sign is very useful in localizing lung lesions as all structures forming cardiac silhouette are in contact with a specific portion of the lung.

== History ==
The sign was described by the American radiologist Benjamin Felson and his brother Henry Felson in a 1950 paper in Radiology, which used it to work out the position of a lesion from a single frontal chest film.
