= Companion shadow =

Phenomenon in radiographs

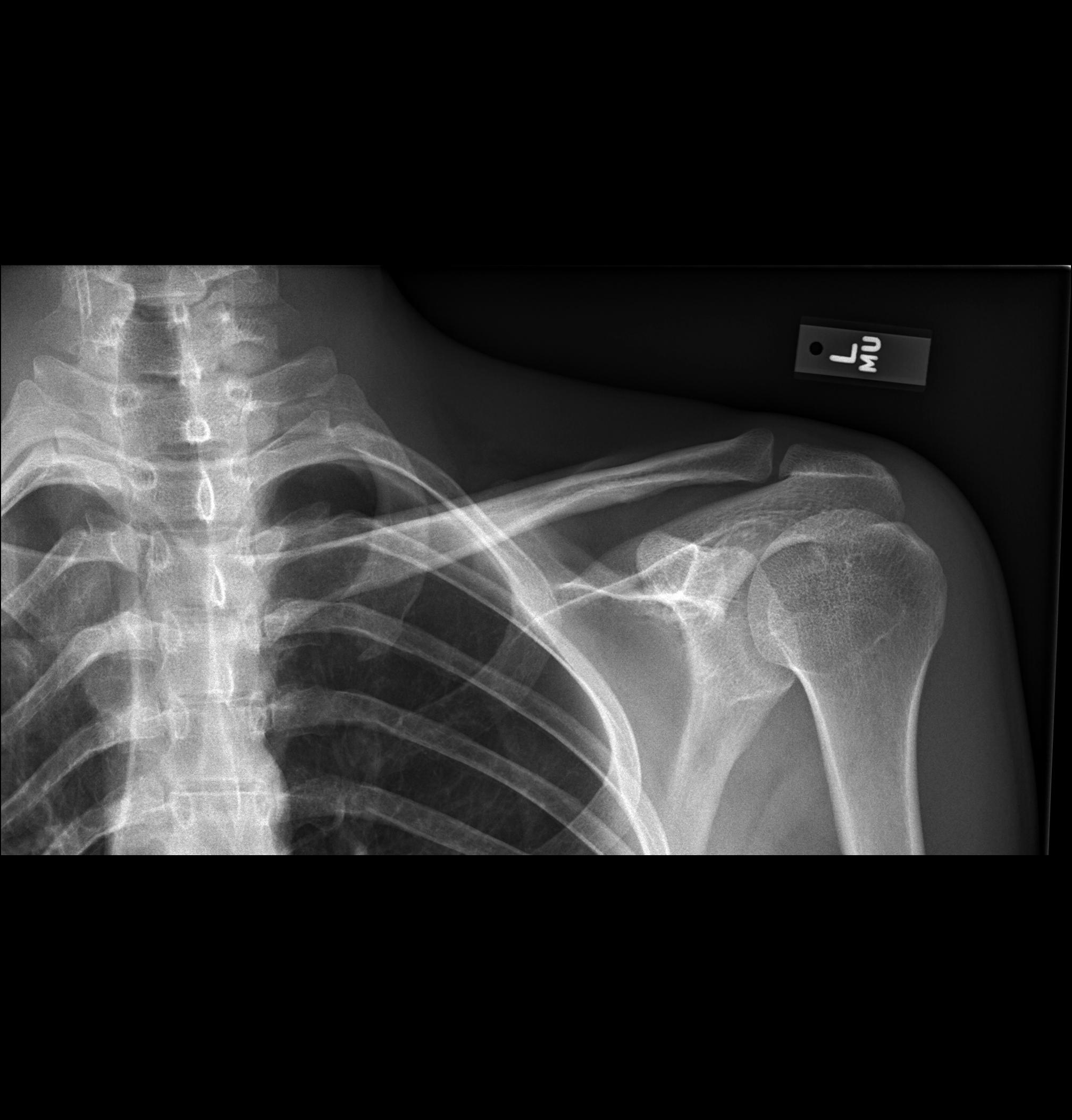
AP radiograph demonstrating companion shadow of the clavicle

A rib companion shadow (indicated by two arrows)

Companion shadow is a term used in describing radiographs that denotes the appearance of a smooth, homogenous, radiodensity with a well-defined margin that runs parallel with a bony landmark. Companion shadows represent soft tissue that overlies the respective bony landmark in profile. They are not seen in every radiograph and can be misinterpreted as pathology.

== Types of companion shadow ==
- Clavicular companion shadow is a thin soft-tissue stripe along the upper edge of the clavicle.
- Rib companion shadows parallel the ribs and measure 1–5 mm in diameter project adjacent to the inferior and inferolateral margins of the first and second ribs and the axillary portions of the lower ribs. These companion shadows of the first and second ribs occur in 35% and 31% of the population, respectively. Rib companion shadows represent the fat and muscles in the intercostal space. The shadows that accompany the ribs may mimic pleural and lung disease.
- Scapular companion shadow overlie the scapula, with a smooth, well-defined margin parallel to the medial border of the scapula. The companion shadow results from unusual radiographic position of the scapula, which causes a soft-tissue fold to occur along its medial border. Winging of the scapula may also be responsible for the shadow. Scapular companion shadows may be mistaken for a soft-tissue or pleural lesion.
