= Louis Denis Jules Gavarret =

French physician

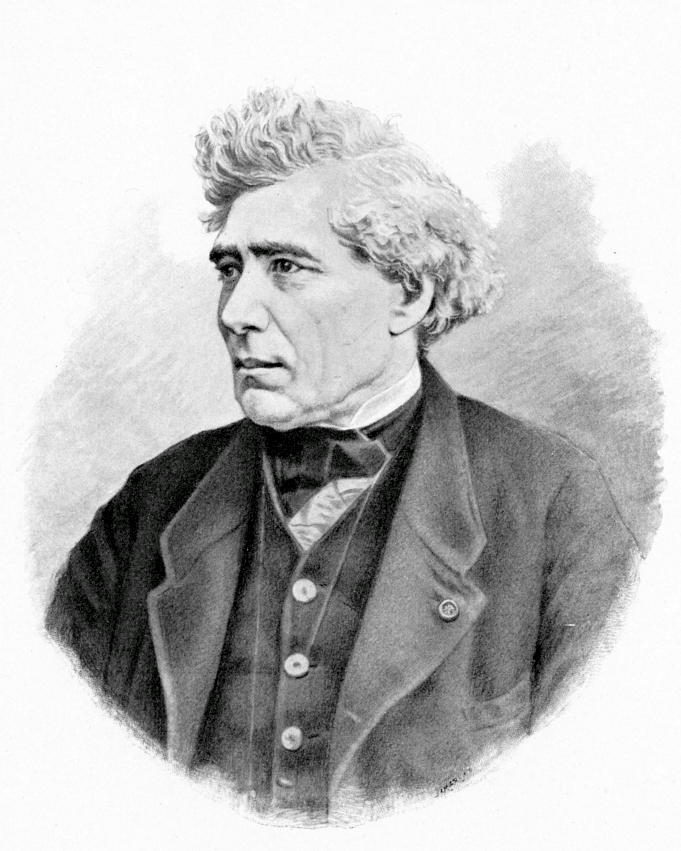
Gavarret in Corlieu A .: Centenary of the Paris Faculty of Medicine (1794–1894), F. Alcan (Paris), 1894.

Louis Denis Jules Gavarret, sometimes referred to as Louis Dominique Jules Gavarret (28 January 1809 – 30 August 1890) was a French medical doctor who advocated the use of statistics in medicine.

== Life ==
Gavarret was born in Astaffort, Lot-et-Garonne. He studied at the Ecole Polytechnique in Paris, followed by military service as an artillery officer. In 1833 he resigned his commission and began his studies with Gabriel Andral (1797–1876).

Gavarret is remembered for the systemization and expansion of Pierre Charles Alexandre Louis' (1787–1872) statistical methodology in regards to medicine. Pierre Louis' contention was to make medicine an exact science in diagnosis of a medical condition, and also to refute the "inductive approach" that was prevalent at the time. Gavarret was a major proponent of the statistical method. He emphasized that the process would only work under certain conditions, such as the medical cases must be comparable, and there has to exist enough examples to reach an exact conclusion. Gavarett's precision or "confidence rate" was calculated to be 99.5% or a ratio of 212:1. In essence, the two doctors believed that through knowledge of the aggregate patient data, the disease and treatment would be understood.

In 1840, Gavarret and Gabriel Andral were the first to show that blood composition varied depending on the pathological condition of the subject. Their research demonstrated the value of blood chemistry as a means of confirming diagnoses.

His later work largely dealt with topics in the fields of biophysics and physiology, that included research of acoustic and phonation phenomena.

== Writings ==
- Sur les modifications de properties de quelques principes du sang (fibrine, globules, materiaux solides du sérum, et eau) dans les maladies. Ann Chim 1840 (with G. Andral).
- Recherches sur la quantité d’acide carbonique exhalé par le poumon dans l’espèce humaine. written with G. Andral 30 pages, 1 pl. Paris, Masson & cie., 1843. Ext. Annales de chimie et de physique.
- Principes généraux de statistique médicale, Béchet Jne et Labé, L. Gavarret, Paris, 1840.
- Lois générales de l'électricité dynamique (1843)
- Physique médicale. De la chaleur produite par les êtres vivants, (1855)
- Les phénomènes physiques de la vie, (1869).

== Bibliography ==
- History of Statistical Thinking in Medicine
