= Air bronchogram =

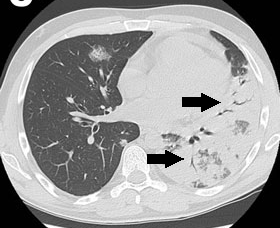
CT scan of air bronchograms in a case of legionnaires' disease.

An air bronchogram is defined as a pattern of air-filled bronchi on a background of airless lung.

== Consolidations ==
In pulmonary consolidations and infiltrates, air bronchograms are most commonly caused by pneumonia or pulmonary edema (especially with alveolar edema).

Other potential causes of consolidations or infiltrates with air bronchograms are:

- Pulmonary edema
- Non-obstructive atelectasis
- Severe interstitial lung disease
- Pulmonary infarct
- Pulmonary hemorrhage
- Normal expiration

== Lung nodules ==
For lung nodules, air bronchograms used to be associated with infectious causes of consolidation and, therefore to be benign. However, in the setting of a lung nodule, an air bronchogram is actually more frequent in malignant than in benign nodules. studied the tumour-bronchus relationship and described five types:

- In “Type 1” the bronchial lumen is patent up to the tumour.
- In “Type 2” the bronchus is contained in the tumor.

These types are more common in malignant nodules.

- A compressed and narrowed bronchus is defined as “Type 3”, and can occur in both benign and malignant nodules.
- Narrowing of the proximal bronchial tree is described as “type 4” and is associated with malignancy.
- “Type 5” is a bronchus compressed and flattened by the nodule with intact smooth wall. This type is mainly seen in benign nodules.

Keeping in mind how a tumour with lepidic growth expands, it is not surprising that the air bronchogram in these tumours is smooth. In contradistinction, a desmoplastic response may cause irregularities of the bronchogram. When retraction of tumoural fibrosis occur, the air bronchogram can even become somewhat dilated. Although this sign can occur in all lung cancer cell types, it is more common in adenocarcinoma. Studies suggest the association of this sign with an activated epidermal growth factor receptor (EGFR) mutation.
