= Lung surgery =

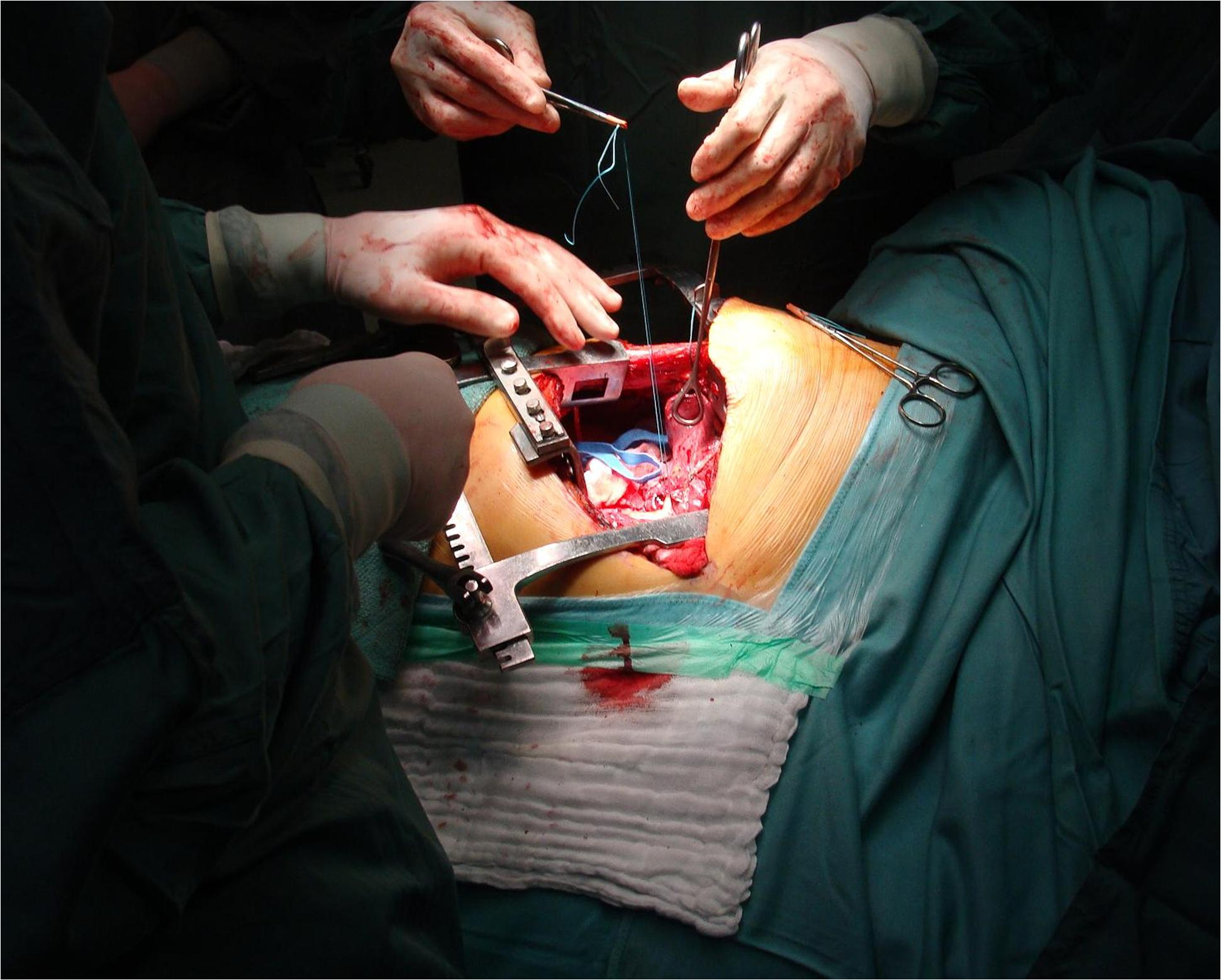
- Two surgeons performing a Lobectomy.
- Specialty: Cardiothoracic surgery
- MeSH: D013510

Lung surgery is a type of thoracic surgery involving the repair or removal of lung tissue, and can be used to treat a variety of conditions ranging from lung cancer to pulmonary hypertension. Common operations include anatomic and nonanatomic resections, pleurodesis and lung transplants. Though records of lung surgery date back to the Classical Age, new techniques such as VATS continue to be developed.

== History ==
The first written records of lung surgery were provided by Hippocrates, where he described a treatment for thoracic empyema by means of drainage. Thoracic procedures became more viable with the advent of positive pressure ventilation, introduced by Samuel Meltzer in 1909. This technique enables surgeons to conduct open chest procedures without risking hypoxia, significantly decreasing patient mortality and is presently used in conjunction with double-lumen endotracheal intubation to isolate the ventilation of the affected lung during surgery. The 20th century saw further innovation of new procedures, such as the first-ever pneumonectomy performed by Evarts Graham in 1933. A breakthrough in minimally invasive lung surgery was also achieved in the form of thoracoscopy, developed by Hans Christian Jacobaeus in 1910 as a method to diagnose tuberculosis. Thoracoscopy was later used by surgeons to perform chest operations without open thoracotomy. However, the latter remains a widely used method to access the pleural cavity.

=== Obsolete procedures ===
Before the advent of tuberculosis chemotherapy in the 1940s, the disease was treated via collapse therapy. This involved the creation of an artificial pneumothorax, aimed at resting the infected lung to limit infection spread and accelerate healing. The traumatic nature of collapse therapy and the discovery of antituberculosis drugs has rendered the former obsolete.

== Types of lung diseases ==
=== Lung cancer ===
Lung cancer can be classified into two main types: non-small cell lung cancer (NSCLC) and small cell lung cancer (SCLC). NSCLC, the most common of the two types, is a group of cancers including squamous cell carcinoma, adenocarcinoma and large cell carcinoma. SCLC is highly aggressive and consists of small ovoid cells. Surgical resection is used curatively in stage I-III NSCLC and palliatively in stage IV.

=== Pneumothorax ===
A pneumothorax, also known as a collapsed lung, is a collection of air outside the lung in the pleural cavity. Depending on etiology, a pneumothorax is classified as spontaneous, traumatic and iatrogenic. A spontaneous pneumothorax is further classified as primary and secondary, with the former occurring in individuals with no clinical lung disease and the latter occurring as a complication of preexisting lung disease.

=== Chronic obstructive pulmonary disease ===
Chronic obstructive pulmonary disease (COPD) is a group of diseases that results in airflow blockage and therefore cause breathing-related issues. COPD includes emphysema as well as chronic bronchitis.

=== Cystic fibrosis ===
Cystic fibrosis is a genetic disease, caused by a mutation that results in defects in movement of salt and water in and out of cells which can cause sticky mucus in the body's tubes and passageways such as in the lungs.

=== Pulmonary hypertension ===
Pulmonary hypertension occurs as a result of excess pressure in the blood vessels from the heart to the lungs. An increased amount of muscle in the walls of the blood vessels to the lung is prominent in cases with pulmonary hypertension. Although there are treatments such as oxygen therapy and medicine that is given to reduce swelling, lung transplantation may be necessary in some extreme cases.

=== Idiopathic pulmonary fibrosis ===
Idiopathic pulmonary fibrosis causes the lungs to become scarred which results in a difficulty in breathing. The causes are of this disease is still not fully known, however, prevention methods include self-care such as stopping smoking and exercising. Medicines such as pirfenidone and nintedanib are also commonly used in order to reduce the rate of scarring in the lungs. Lung transplantation is effective in certain cases, however this depends on the availability of healthy donor lungs.

== Anatomic resections ==
Gross anatomy of the lungs. Note the five lung lobes divided by the three lung fissures and the main, lobar and segmental bronchi.

Anatomic resections refer to procedures where a section of the lung is removed with respect to lobar or segmental anatomy. These include pneumonectomies, lobectomies and segmentectomies and are commonly used for the treatment of NSCLC. Preoperative evaluations for resections include cancer staging via a chest CT scan and PET scan, followed by assessments of pulmonary reserve volume and cardiac function to determine the amount of lung tissue that can be safely removed without developing pulmonary insufficiency. Following tissue removal, the resultant bronchial stumps are pressurised under water to check for air leaks before the resection is deemed complete.

=== Pneumonectomy ===
A pneumonectomy is the surgical removal of an entire lung. Due to the high morbidity and mortality of the procedure, its viability for treating lung cancer is a subject of debate. However, pneumonectomies are still used for lung carcinomas that are large and centrally located or have invaded the interlobar fissures. Another indication for the use this procedure is lung destruction due to chronic infections.

During a pneumonectomy, the pleural cavity is accessed through a thoracotomy. With direct access to the tumour, the need for pneumonectomy is reassessed. After surgeons decide to proceed with the procedure, the hilar structures are dissected sequentially. The pulmonary artery, then the pulmonary veins, are divided via stapling. Next, the main bronchus is divided using a scalpel and the lung is removed from the pleural cavity. The bronchial stump is subsequently closed by polyglactin sutures. Finally, mediastinal lymph nodes are dissected.

=== Lobectomy ===
A lobectomy is the surgical removal of one of the five lung lobes (right upper, right middle, right lower, left upper and left lower lobes). Lobectomies are the most common type of lung surgery and the standard operation for most NSCLC patients. Though specific surgical techniques vary for each lobe, the general workflow is identical. The lobe to be resected is first visualized through thoracotomy or thoracoscopy. Next, the surrounding lymph nodes are harvested to check for metastasis. After confirmation that no metastasis has taken place, the vasculature of the lobe is controlled by blood vessel division using a stapler. Stapling is also used to divide the lobar bronchus and subsequently separate the lobe along the lung fissure(s). After the lobe is removed, lymph node dissection is completed.

Specific considerations exist for certain lobes. Right middle lobectomies are not usually carried out alone and are instead part of a bilobectomy alongside a right upper or lower lobectomy. Left upper lobectomies require additional caution to avoid arterial branches from the fissure and proximal pulmonary artery. Another risk is the proximity of the recurrent laryngeal nerve to the upper mediastinal lymph nodes, which increases its risk of injury during lymph node dissection. Thus, a swallowing study is required if nerve damage is suspected postoperatively.

==== Sleeve lobectomy ====
A sleeve lobectomy is a lobectomy that is coupled with the removal of a part of the main bronchus. The ends of the bronchus are then rejoined to reattach any remaining lung lobes. This procedure is performed in lieu of pneumonectomy when surgeons determine the removal of the entire lung to be unnecessary for centrally located tumours.

=== Segmentectomy ===
Segmentectomies are the surgical removal of bronchopulmonary segments and often involve the removal of two adjacent segments. The pulmonary arterial branches to the segments are first identified then divided. Next, stapling is used to divide the segmental bronchi and separate the segments from the lung. Compared to lobectomies, this procedure has higher survivability for stage 1A patients with tumours ≤ 2 cm in diameter.

== Non-anatomic resections ==
Non-anatomic resections refer to the removal of lung tissue without respect to lobar or segmental anatomy. They can be used to treat a variety of lung diseases such as NSCLC and tuberculosis.

=== Wedge resection ===
A wedge resection is the non-anatomic removal of a triangular-shaped piece of tissue from the lungs. The utility of wedge resection in NSCLC is disputed. Wedge resection is currently used in NSCLC patients with low pulmonary function, or for pulmonary tuberculosis patients with multiple lesions which do not respect intersegmental boundaries.

=== Bleb resection ===
A bleb resection is the surgical removal of one or more blebs, small collections of air between the lung and visceral pleura. Blebs may combine to form larger cysts named bullae. The rupture of blebs or bullae results in air leaking into the pleural space, causing a spontaneous pneumothorax. In most cases, patients will be unaware of blebs until they are detected by CT scans or cause noticeable symptoms such as chest pain.

Bleb resections may be done via mini-thoracotomy or thoracoscopy. After inspection of the chest cavity, identified blebs are removed via dissection and stapling. To prevent future bleb formation, this procedure is often accompanied by pleurodesis.

== Pneumothorax treatment ==
A pneumothorax is commonly treated with needle aspiration of air followed by chest tube drainage. In the case of a recurrent pneumothorax, pleurodesis may be used to prevent further air accumulation.

=== Pleurodesis ===
Pleurodesis is the obliteration of the pleural space, achieved by adhering the visceral pleura on the lung surface to the costal pleura of the chest wall. Adhesion is caused by inflammation and subsequent scarring of the pleural layers. Inflammation may be induced by either physical or chemical irritation. The former is commonly used in younger patients and involves surgical abrasion. The latter involves the instillation of chemical sclerosant, usually sterile talc, via a chest tube. Other sclerosing agents include tetracycline and bleomycin. After sclerosant instillation, the patient may be moved through various positions to ensure even distribution. Due to the pain of this operation, it is accompanied by local anaesthesia. Pleurodesis is also used in recurrent pleural effusion, a common result of lung cancer.

== Lung transplant ==
Lung transplant is defined as 'an operation to remove and replace a diseased lung with a healthy human lung from a donor. A donor is most commonly known to be a deceased person, however, in very rare cases a section of the lung that is required for a patient can be transplanted from a living donor. Lung transplants are usually required when a patient has advanced lung disease whereby the disease is also unresponsive to other methods of treatment. Another significant reason for a lung transplant to be considered as a necessary option is if the patients' life expectancy is predicted to be under three years without the lung transplant procedure taking place. Typical conditions that are treated with a lung transplant include COPD, cystic fibrosis, pulmonary hypertension and idiopathic pulmonary fibrosis.

=== Preserving donor lungs ===
Methods for the preservation of donor lungs are imperative in order to increase availability of lungs for transplantation which therefore increases the efficacy of the treatment as more available lungs for transplantation leads to more people being applicable to undergo the treatment/transplantation. Before an organ is removed from the donor for transplantation, the donor organ is commonly flushed free of blood with a preservation solution that is prepared to be ice-cold which also contains essential elements such as electrolytes and nutrients. Furthermore, when the organ is removed from the donor, it is packaged in wet ice for preservation of the organ. A therapy called ex-vivo lung perfusion that is commonly used for the donor lung just before transplantation provides an enhancement of the quality of the organ and can potentially make previously unsuitable organs, safe for transplantation.

== Post-surgical procedures ==
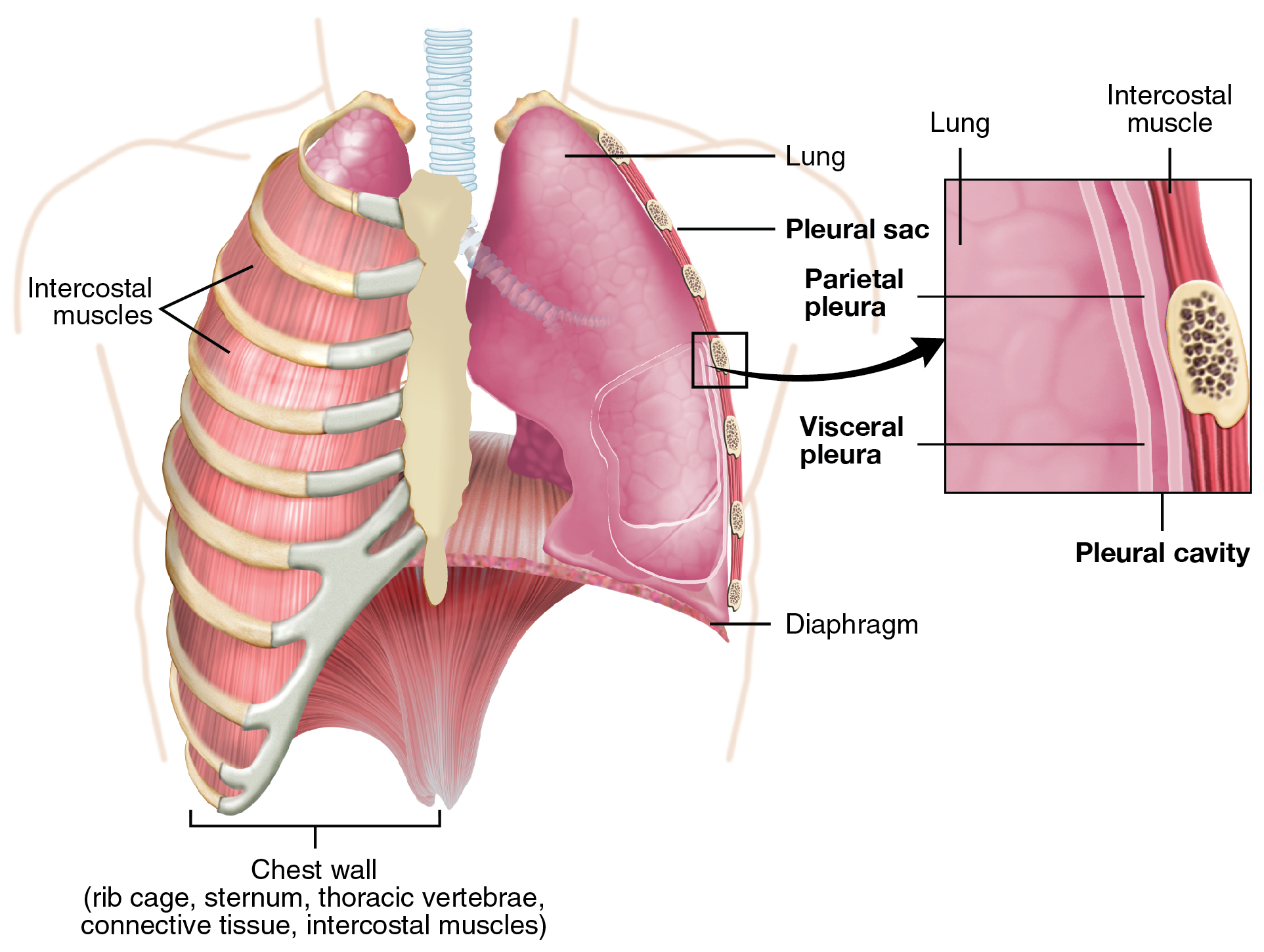
Anatomy of the pleural cavity. The pressure within the cavity is normally lower than the atmosphere to facilitate inhalation.

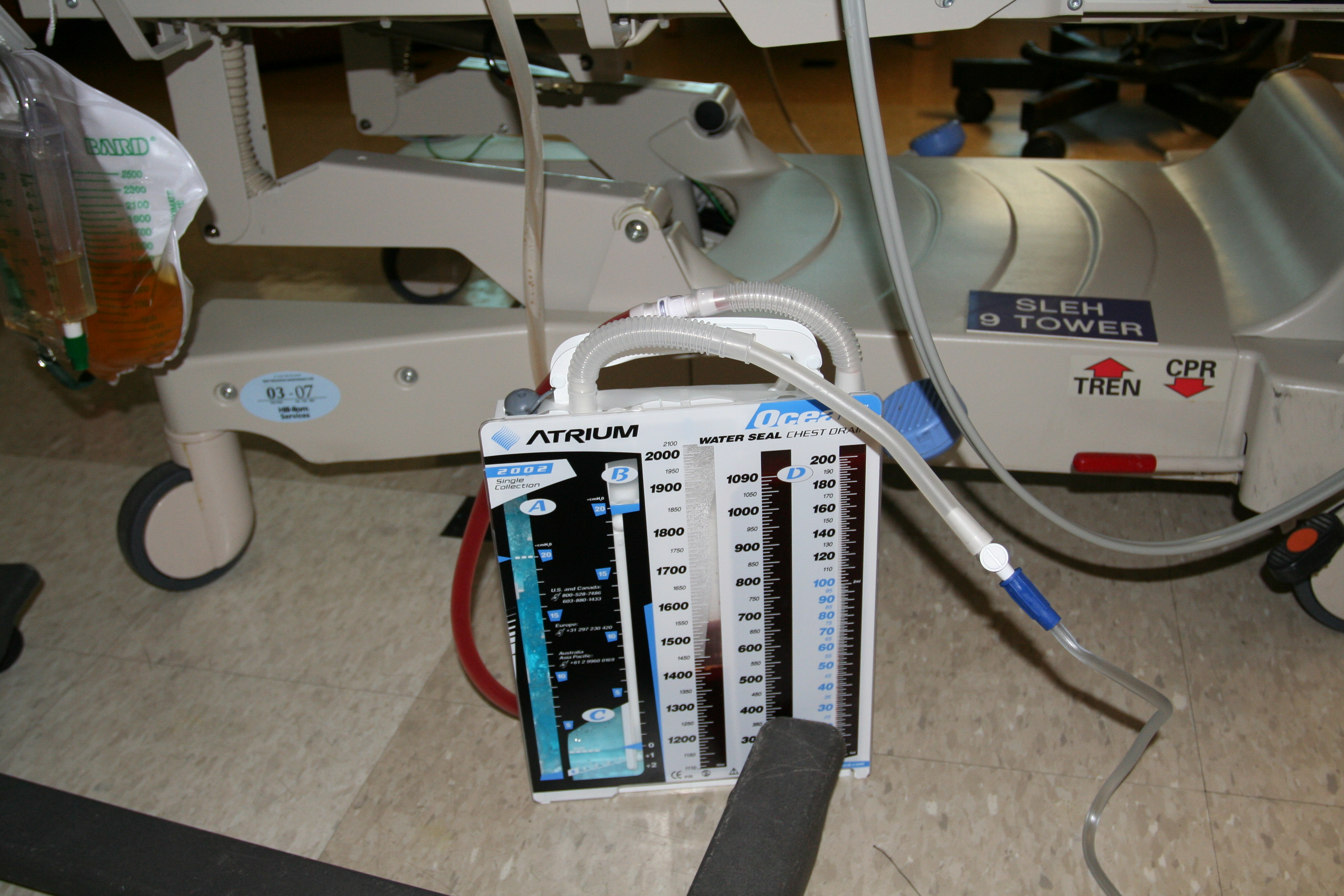
Chest tube drainage system. Note the three chambers for fluid collection, one-way air passage and suction control.

All lung surgeries breach the pleural cavity, which disrupts the negative intrapleural pressure and prevents normal breathing. Surgical trauma may also lead to pleural effusion, further disrupting intrapleural pressure. To counteract these disruptions, a chest tube which is attached to a drainage system consisting of a collection chamber, one-way water valve and suction chamber is inserted into the patient. This enables air and fluid to be unidirectionally extracted from the pleural cavity. Chest tubes are usually removed one week after surgery along with any stitches or staples in the incisions.

Patients experiencing shortness of breath will be guided through deep breathing or coughing exercises by a physician or respiratory therapist. In severe cases, the patient will also receive oxygen supplementation through a mask or nostril tube.

== Risks and complications ==
=== Pneumonectomy ===
A pneumonectomy comes with its own risks whereby the most common complications are cardiac arrhythmia as well as atrial fibrillation (or flutter), which commonly occurs in the first three days following the surgery. Furthermore, additional risks following this surgery include: cardiac herniation, pulmonary complications (e.g. pneumonia), bronchopleural fistula, pulmonary oedema, multi-organ dysfunction, acute lung injury, acute respiratory distress syndrome (ARDS) and postoperative acute kidney injury.

=== Lobectomy ===
Lobectomies share many of the complications that come with a pneumonectomy. However, additional risks that can result from a lobectomy include empyema, which is an area of pus in the chest cavity, as well as pleural effusion, which occurs as a result of fluid in the space between the lung and inner chest wall.

=== Segmentectomy ===
Similar to other anatomic resections, cardiac arrhythmia is a major complication for segmentectomy. Additionally, hemorrhage in the pleural cavity may occur due to injury to the pulmonary artery or its branches. Patients may also develop a contralateral pneumothorax, necessitating the placement of a chest tube to eliminate air within the pleural cavity.

=== Non-anatomic resections ===
Wedge resections share the complications of anatomic resections. However, the former generally has lower patient mortality. The major complications of bleb resection are prolonged air leak and pneumothorax recurrence.

=== Pleurodesis ===
Pleurodesis may lead to a fever due to the induced inflammatory response. Chemical pleurodesis, specifically that using talc, may also cause ARDS via the systemic absorption of sclerosant.

=== Lung transplantation ===
Lung transplantation is an intricate treatment that can provide efficient results, however, there are risks that come with this procedure which include: bleeding, infection, blockage of the blood vessels to the new lungs, blockage of the airways, severe pulmonary oedema as well as potential blood clot formation.

== Future directions ==
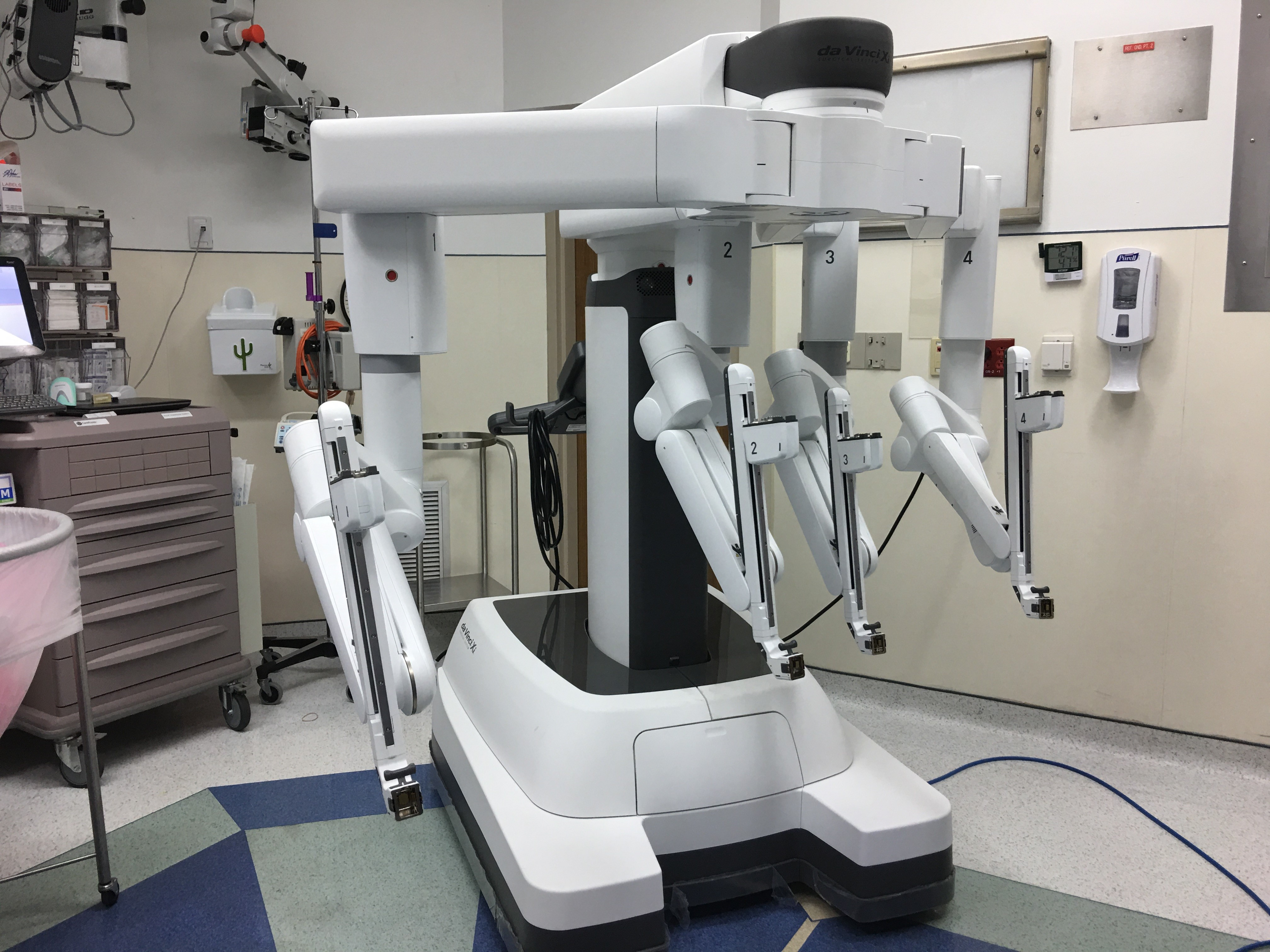
The mechanical arm module of a surgical robot.

Lung surgeries can be perceived as invasive procedures that may cause side effects such as bruising, swelling, numbness, pain, scarring and infection. However, new methods such as video-assisted thoracoscopic surgery (VATS) provide a minimally invasive method which can eliminate diseased parts of the lungs and lymph nodes. A development of thoracoscopy, VATS utilizes small, high-resolution cameras which are inserted into the chest through small incisions. This grants surgeons a high degree of visibility into the pleural cavity despite making smaller incisions, resulting in quicker patient recovery.

Moreover, treatment for lung cancer has been further developed with the use of robotic surgery as a method for treatment. This method involves the use of robotic arms which are manipulated by a surgeon at a console, enabling more precise movements and providing the surgeon with 3D vision of the surgical site. Similar to VATS, robotic surgery has also been found to be minimally invasive and is extremely useful for removing certain parts of lung tissue that are diseased as well as surrounding lymph nodes. However, comparisons of current robotic methods with VATS have shown no significant differences in patient outcome.
