= Interventional pulmonology =

Interventional pulmonology (IP, also called interventional pulmonary medicine) is a maturing medical sub-specialty from its parent specialty of pulmonary medicine. It deals specifically with minimally invasive endoscopic and percutaneous procedures for diagnosis and treatment of neoplastic as well as non-neoplastic diseases of the airways, lungs, and pleura. Many IP procedures constitute efficacious yet less invasive alternatives to thoracic surgery.

== History ==
Before the advent of optical fibers and advances in anesthesiology, interventional pulmonary procedures were mostly limited to foreign body retrieval via rigid bronchoscopy. Gustav Killian (June 2, 1860 – February 24, 1921), a German laryngologist, performed foreign body retrievals from bronchial passages using a rigid laryngoscope/bronchoscope whereas in the United States, Chevalier Jackson (1865 – 1958) was the first to use the rigid bronchoscope. Later, Swedish internist Hans-Christian Jacobaeus first introduced thoracoscopy in a 1910 paper published in the journal Münch med Wochenschr, before Japanese thoracic surgeon Shiketo Ikeda (1925 – 2001) introduced the fiberoptic bronchoscope in the late 20th century. Jean-Francois Dumon from France is credited with modernizing rigid bronchoscopy in the late 20th century by introducing a novel non-metallic airway stent made of silicone, appropriately named the Dumon stent. Together, these developments laid the foundation for most of today’s interventional pulmonary techniques.

In 1978, Kopen Wang and colleagues at Johns Hopkins Hospital described the use of transbronchial needle aspiration (TBNA) through a rigid bronchoscope to diagnose a paratracheal mediastinal mass. Following the advent of endobronchial ultrasound (EBUS), which first became available in the early 21st century, EBUS-TBNA swiftly replaced mediastinoscopy as the first-line in mediastinal staging for lung cancer. With these developments, interventional pulmonology became much more firmly established on the map of distinct subspecialties.

In 1992, the Association for Bronchology and Interventional Pulmonology (AABIP) was formed as a representative society of interventional pulmonologists based in North America. This organization also publishes a journal, namely the Journal of Bronchology and Interventional Pulmonology. The World Association for Bronchology was founded by Dr. Ikeda in 1978 and renamed as the World Association for Bronchology and Interventional Pulmonology (WABIP) in 2010. It holds a biennial scientific meeting known as the World Congress for Bronchology and Interventional Pulmonology. The Association for Interventional Pulmonology Program Directors (AIPPD), dedicated to the advancement of IP education in the United States, was created in 2012.

== Procedures ==
In addition to basic bronchoscopic and pleural procedures that are performed by a general pulmonologist, an interventional pulmonologist may perform the following advanced procedures:

=== Advanced procedures ===
- Endobronchial ultrasound (EBUS) – curvilinear and radial. EBUS allows mediastinal visualization and sampling via transbronchial nodal aspiration (TBNA). This is an important alternative to mediastinoscopy, a significantly more invasive thoracic surgical procedure
- Endoscopic ultrasound (EUS) in the esophagus. This can also be used for mediastinal visualization and sampling via TBNA
- Electromagnetic navigational biopsy (ENB). This is used for localization and sampling of peripheral lung lesions
- Cryobiopsy. This is an increasingly recognized less invasive alternative to surgical lung biopsy for diagnosis of interstitial lung disease
- Medical pleuroscopy for inspection and biopsy. This procedure, performed under conscious sedation without the need for subsequent hospitalization, offers a less invasive alternative to video-assisted thoracoscopic surgery (VATS)
- Pleural biopsy – closed or ultrasound-guided
- Trans-thoracic sampling of a peripheral lung lesion

=== Advanced therapeutic procedures ===
- Percutaneous tracheostomy, a procedure performed at the bedside that offers a less invasive alternative to surgical tracheotomy
- Transtracheal oxygen catheter placement
- Rigid bronchoscopy
- Airway dilatation for stenosis
- Airway tumor ablation – involving microdebridement, hot therapies (e.g. argon plasma coagulation, laser therapy, electrocautery, and photodynamic therapy), and cold therapies (e.g. cryotherapy). Laser therapy is used for coagulation and ablation of endobronchial tumors and stenoses, as well as for relieving bronchial and tracheal obstructions. The effects are immediate and may provide rapid relief of airway obstruction and tumor-related symptoms
- Other lesion debulking procedures e.g. microdebridement
- Airway stenting – using metallic and non-metallic (e.g. silicone) stents
- Endobronchial brachytherapy
- Intra-tumoral chemotherapy or ablative therapy
- Endobronchial valve placement. This can be performed for persistent post-operative air leaks and also for bronchoscopic lung volume reduction (BLVR), a less invasive alternative to lung volume reduction surgery (LVRS)
- Bronchial thermoplasty for asthma
- Whole lung lavage, the standard treatment for pulmonary alveolar proteinosis
- Tunneled pleural catheter placement. This enables patients to self-manage their chronic pleural effusion (malignant or non-malignant)
- Chemical pleurodesis - either via chest tube instillation of the sclerosing agent (slurry) or instillation via medical pleuroscopy (poudrage)
- Percutaneous endoscopic gastrostomy (PEG) tube placement

== Training and certification ==
For purposes of formal training in interventional pulmonology, dedicated training programs only became available in the early 21st century. The first dedicated program was a 12-month advanced fellowship offered by Dr. Beamis at Lahey Clinic in Boston. Currently, there are over 30 IP fellowship programs across the country. However, training programs have varied considerably in terms of the breadth and depth of procedural training that they offer.

To address the issue of inconsistent IP training across fellowship programs, representative members from five professional organizations (AABIP, AIPPD, ACCP, ATS, and APCCMPD) jointly published a list of minimum standards required by July 2019 in order for IP fellowship programs to receive formal accreditation from the AABIP and AIPPD.

To be eligible for this fellowship, applicants must first complete a three-year fellowship in pulmonary & critical care medicine. Most of these programs select one to two fellow(s) per year, applying though the Interventional Pulmonary Fellow Application Service (IPFAS©). As with most other medical specialties and subspecialties across the United States, applicants are matched to programs through the National Resident Matching Program (NRMP, or the “Match”).

As of 2024, interventional pulmonology has achieved ACGME accreditation.
