= VATS lobectomy =

Approach to lung cancer surgery

- Specialty: Surgical oncology

Video-assisted thoracoscopic surgery (VATS) lobectomy is an approach to lung cancer surgery.

== Thoracotomy ==
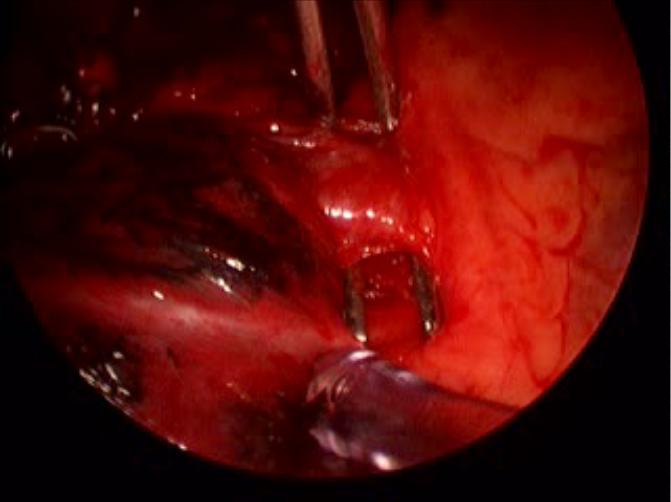
Dissection of the right superior pulmonary vein with VATS

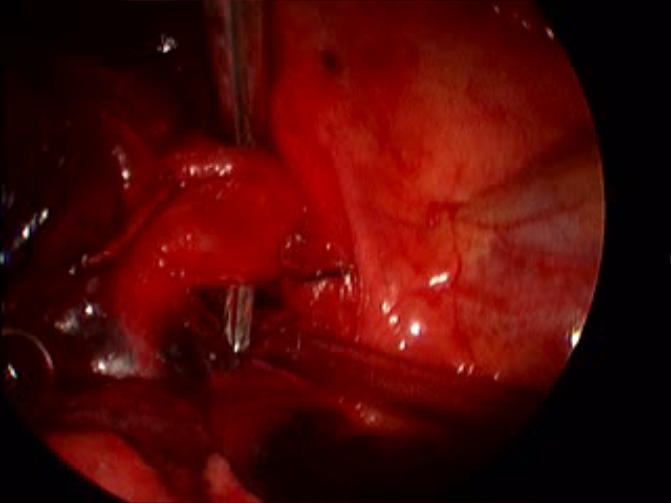
Dissection of the anterior trunk of the right pulmonary artery with VATS

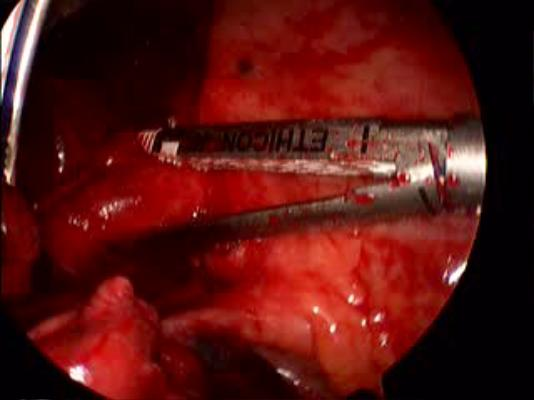
Preparing to divide the anterior trunk of the right pulmonary artery with the endoscopic stapler

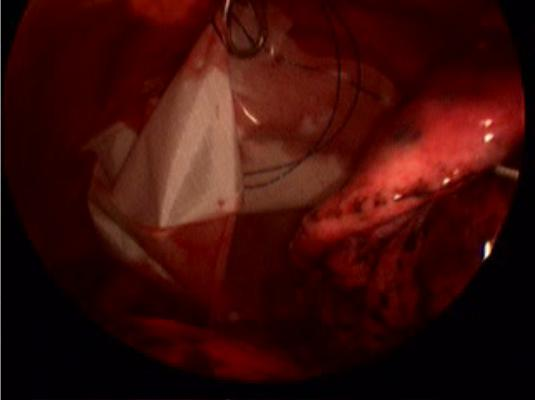
Placing the resected lobe into a water-tight bag for removal from the chest

Anatomic lung resection, i.e. pulmonary lobectomy or pneumonectomy, in conjunction with removal of the lymph nodes from the mediastinum is the treatment modality that provides the greatest chance of long-term survival in patients with early stage non-small-cell lung cancer. Anatomic lung resections require a dissection of the pulmonary hilum with individual ligation and division of the pulmonary artery, pulmonary vein, and the bronchus where these enter the lung. In the setting of lung cancer, the rationale for anatomic lung resection is a complete removal of a lung tumor along with the lymphatics that drain that tumor to assure that any tumor cells present in the lymphatics will also be removed; lesser resections have been shown to be associated with a higher risk of local recurrence and diminished long-term survival. A cornerstone of surgical treatment of early stage lung cancer is aggressive removal of lymph nodes from the mediastinum; this enhances the likelihood of removing all cancer cells (complete resection) and identifies patients who will require additional treatment (i.e. adjuvant chemotherapy). An important consideration when performing anatomic lung resection is to spare as much lung tissue as possible; while lobectomy and pneumonectomy are equivalent cancer operations, the risk of complications and morbidity is considerably less with lobectomy.

Traditionally, pulmonary lobectomy is performed through a poster-lateral thoracotomy incision; over decades, thoracotomy has demonstrated its effectiveness in providing access to structures in the thorax and is in general tolerated by patients. Thoracotomy, as most commonly performed, requires cutting through one or more major muscles of the chest wall including the latissimus dorsi, pectoralis or serratus muscles, and spreading of the ribs with a rib spreader. Because the joints of the ribs with the vertebral bodies have only limited flexibility, the use of a rib spreader usually results in rib fracture in the process of rendering the interspace between the ribs wide enough to perform a pulmonary lobectomy. Because of this, thoracic surgeons generally intentionally remove a section of one or more ribs in an effort to prevent splintered rib fracture associated with the use of the rib spreader. There is wide consensus that thoracotomy is one of the most painful incisions that patients can undergo. In the initial post-operative setting after thoracotomy, the use of epidural catheters, patient-controlled analgesia pumps for intravenous narcotic administration, and intravenous ketorolac are commonplace and patients generally require a 7- to 10-day hospital stay before their pain is adequately controlled with oral opioid analgesics that they can take at home. A great deal of emphasis is placed on post-operative pulmonary toilet because the incisional pain associated with thoracotomy leads to a decreased ability of patients to cough and clear bronchial secretions, which in turn leads to an increased risk of persistent atelectasis (collapsed areas of lung) or pneumonia. Finally, to allow time for the divided muscles and bone fractures to heal, patients must refrain from strenuous activity or lifting greater than 5 lbs for 6 weeks after surgery.

== History ==
Video-assisted thoracoscopic surgery, or VATS, came into widespread use in the 1990s and early on in its development practitioners began to perform lobectomy via VATS incisions. The advantage of VATS over thoracotomy is that major chest wall muscles are not divided and ribs are not spread. This leads to reductions in the intensity and duration of post-operative pain and allows patients to return to full activity more quickly.

== For lung cancer ==
VATS lobectomy is the same as lobectomy performed via thoracotomy in that the pulmonary artery, pulmonary vein, and bronchus to the involved pulmonary lobe are individually dissected, ligated and divided. Generally, endoscopic stapling devices are used to ligate and divide the vessels and the bronchus however conventional suture material can also be used. During VATS lobectomy, the structures being operated on are not directly visualized with the naked eye but are visualized solely with a rigid thoracoscope. A camera attached to the thoracoscope transmits the image to a video screen, which allows surgeons and assistants to observe the flow of the operation. Surgical specimens are placed into a water-tight bag and removed from the chest without morcellization (i.e. breaking up the specimen into small pieces before removal); this prevents seeding of the VATS incisions with tumor cells and allows for an intact specimen for pathology examination and cancer staging. Removal of lymph nodes from the mediastinum is not compromised by VATS and remains a cornerstone of the surgical therapy of lung cancer. Visualization is enhanced due to the magnification afforded by the fiberoptic thoracoscope and a 30-degree angle of visualization aids in looking around corners. However, because the incisions are too small to allow passage of the surgeon's hands into the thorax, the surgeon's tactile input is compromised. VATS operations rely on a thorough understanding of pulmonary anatomy to allow for strategically placed incisions (usually 3–5 incisions total). The main advantages of VATS over thoracotomy are that major muscles of the chest wall are not divided and rib spreaders that can lead to rib fractures or costovertebral joint pain are not used. This results in a hospital length of stay after VATS lobectomy generally reported to range from 3–5 days, or roughly half that for lobectomy via thoracotomy. Currently, researchers are studying the effectiveness of erector spine plane blocks (ESPBs), a regional pain control method where a needle is placed using ultrasound between spinal muscles and vertebrae and analgesic is injected to block nerve signaling and reduce pain. This is done without entering the epidural space. Though more research is needed, current reviews suggests that ESPBs are as effective at reducing opioid use and hospital length-of-stay as epidural injections without the not-well tolerated side effects of epidural anesthesia.

== Candidates ==
Not all patients are candidates for VATS lobectomy. The classic indication for a VATS approach to lobectomy is early stage lung cancer in which the primary tumor is 3 cm or less in diameter and located toward the periphery of the lung parenchyma. Tumors that are located close to the major blood vessels or airway where these enter the lung or larger tumors associated with tumor spread to lymph nodes in the central regions of the lung may require the enhanced tactile input afforded by thoracotomy to make sure the tumors are resected with a negative margin, i.e. that the tumor is surrounded completely by a margin of non-cancerous tissue, and that arteries and airways to portions of the lung that are not being removed are preserved intact. In addition, patients who have had pre-operative chemotherapy or radiation for lung cancer or previous chest surgeries may not be candidates for VATS due to scarring around the major blood vessels that makes dissection via VATS difficult. But recent evidence suggests that thoracoscopic lobectomy is a feasible approach for selected patients undergoing resection after induction therapy, and is associated with shorter hospital stay and chest tube duration. Cases in which a lung tumor invades the chest wall and an en bloc resection of ribs must be performed to achieve negative resection margins generally are felt to abrogate the value of VATS. Also pneumonectomy by VATS is a safe and feasible treatment for both benign and malignant lung diseases that induces acceptable damage and has lower morbidity.

== Published benefits ==
Because of the lesser chest wall trauma of VATS compared to thoracotomy, elderly patients have been shown to tolerate lobectomy by VATS better than via thoracotomy. Patients who require chemotherapy after surgery have been shown to be more likely to succeed in completing the prescribed course of chemotherapy after VATS lobectomy compared to lobectomy via thoracotomy. Along with the lesser chest wall trauma and improved pulmonary mechanics, a lesser level of cytokine disturbance has been reported after VATS lobectomy compared to thoracotomy. From the standpoint of medical economics, VATS lobectomy is less expensive than lobectomy performed via thoracotomy because hospital length of stay and number of days in the intensive care unit are significantly reduced.

== See also ==
- Thoracic surgery
- Video-assisted thoracoscopic surgery
