= Maximilian Nitze =

German urologist (1848–1906)

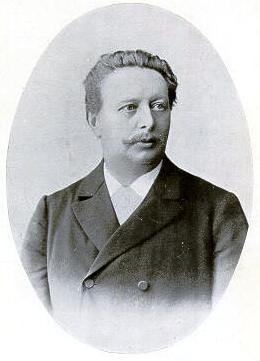
Maximilian Carl-Friedrich Nitze

Maximilian Carl-Friedrich Nitze (September 18, 1848 – February 23, 1906) was a German urologist born in Berlin.

He studied medicine at the Universities of Heidelberg, Würzburg and Leipzig. In 1874 he earned his doctorate, and subsequently became a medical assistant at the city hospital in Dresden. During the 1880s, Nitze founded a private urology hospital in Berlin. He later became a professor of urology at the University of Berlin.

Nitze specialized in research of kidney disorders and other urological problems. Along with Viennese instrument maker Joseph Leiter (1830–1892), he is credited with the invention of the modern cystoscope; a device used in diagnostics of the bladder. The Nitze–Leiter cystoscope was first publicly demonstrated in 1879. Functionally, it used an electrically heated platinum wire for illumination, a cooling system of flowing ice-water, and telescopic lenses for visualization. Invention of the incandescent light bulb by Thomas Edison allowed further improvements to the cystoscope; in 1887 Nitze constructed an apparatus that no longer needed a cooling-system. He is also credited with producing the first endoscopic photographs.

In 1901 the first endoscope-guided laparoscopy of a dog was performed by German physician Georg Kelling (1866–1945). In 1910 Hans Christian Jacobaeus published an account of two cases in which he performed thoracoscopic explorations of the pleural cavity.

Today the Maximilian Nitze Medal is awarded by the German Society of Urology for special contributions in the field of urology.

== Written works ==
- Lehrbuch der Kystoskopie, Wiesbaden 1889 (2. Auflage 1907) (Handbook on cystoscopy).
- Kystophotographischer Atlas, Wiesbaden 1894. (Cystoscopic photography)
