= Bronchoscopic lung volume reduction =

Bronchoscopic lung volume reduction (BLVR) is a procedure to reduce the volume of air within the lungs. BLVR was initially developed in the early 2000s as a minimally invasive treatment for severe COPD that is primarily caused by emphysema. BLVR evolved from earlier surgical approaches first developed in the 1950s to reduce lung volume by removing damaged portions of the lungs via pneumonectomy or wedge resection. Procedures include the use of valves, coils, or thermal vapour ablation.

== Procedures ==
BLVR involves the use of valves, coils, or thermal vapour ablation.

=== Valves ===
Endobronchial valves are inserted using a bronchoscope into sections of the lungs damaged by emphysema. Endobronchial valves are medical devices that allow air to exit these sections but not to re-enter. The valves, in effect, cause damaged lung tissue to deflate, thereby reducing the excessive lung volume (hyperinflation) caused by emphysema. Two endobronchial valves have been approved by the FDA for BLVR: Zephyr and Spiration.

==== Zephyr valve ====
Zephyr, manufactured by Pulmonx Corporation, obtained FDA approval in June, 2018, after a clinical research trial (LIBERATE) led by principal investigator Gerard Criner, MD, of Temple University Hospital.

In the trial, a total of 190 subjects were randomized across 24 hospital sites into two groups. One group received an endobronchial valve. The other received "standard of care" (SOC) under the current guidelines for hyperinflation due to emphysema. The trial found the endobronchial valve reduced residual lung volume and improved exercise tolerance as compared to the SOC group.

==== Spiration valve ====
Spiration, manufactured by Spiration, Inc., obtained FDA approval in December, 2018, after a clinical trial (EMPROVE) showed the valve improved pulmonary function scores among trial participants. The Spiration valve subsequently was first used in treatment by Dr. Criner at Temple University Hospital.

== The procedure ==
BLVR valves are placed into the lungs using a catheter through a bronchoscope. During the one-hour procedure, the patient receives anesthesia through an intravenous line. After the procedure, patients usually remain in the hospital for at least four days. During hospitalization, the patient receives a series of chest X-rays to monitor the position of the valves. An outpatient follow-up appointment is scheduled for seven to 10 days after the procedure. Additional imaging tests, such as X-rays, and bronchoscopies may be required weeks, months or years following the initial BLVR procedure.

== Benefits and risks ==
Benefits	Risks
Improved lung function	COPD exacerbation
Improved exercise tolerance	Respiratory failure
Reversible	Pneumothorax
Lower risk of injury and infection	Pneumonia

Clinical research has found that BLVR confers measurable benefits, including:

- Improved lung function (reduced residual lung volume, as measured by FEV1 in the LIBERATE study)
- Improved exercise tolerance (six-minute walk distance, which improved by nearly 40 meters among patients in the LIBERATE study)
- Reduced risk of injury and infection, as compared to pneumonectomy
- Reversible, as compared to pneumonectomy

BLVR also carries risks, among them:

- Exacerbation of COPD (occurs in as many as 14% of patients)
- Pneumothorax (occurred in 26.6% of patients in the LIBERATE trial)
- Pneumonia (occurs in as many as 9% of patients)
- Valve expectoration (occurs in as many as 16% of patients)

== Research ==
The first clinical research study of BLVR valve implantation was published in The Lancet in 2003. Since that time, nearly 80 additional papers have been published related to the efficacy of BLVR, inclusion criteria, anesthesia management during BLVR, effectiveness relative to lung volume reduction surgery and related topics. Key studies include:

- LIBERATE
- EMPROVE
- NETT
- VENT
- BeLieVeR-HIFi
- STELVIO
