= Loboctomy =

Loboctomy is not a word. Could you have meant one of these?

- Lobotomy, surgery of the prefrontal cortex of the brain
- Lobectomy, surgical excision of a lobe (such as a brain lobe or lung lobe)
