= Resuscitative thoracotomy =

Type of thoracotomy

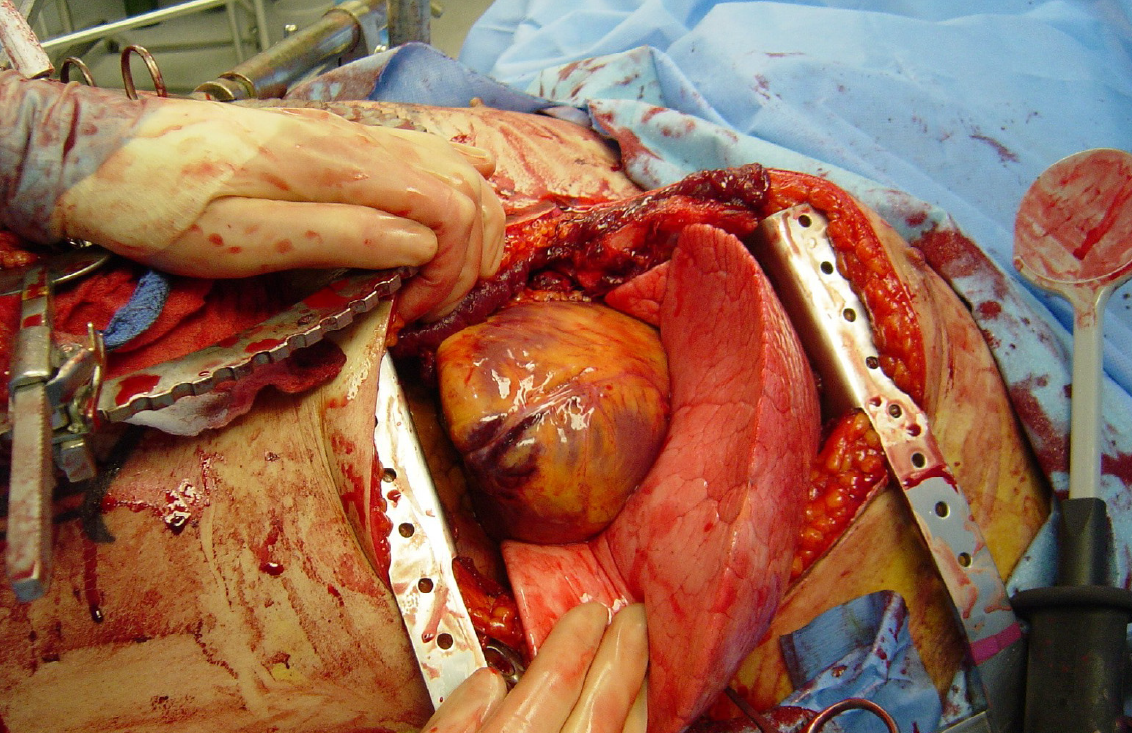
- A left-sided thoracotomy incision, allowing direct access to the pericardium, heart, left hilum and left lung.
- Other names: Emergency department thoracotomy
- eMedicine: 82584

A resuscitative thoracotomy (sometimes referred to as an emergency department thoracotomy (EDT), trauma thoracotomy or, colloquially, as "cracking the chest" or "cracking the patient") is a thoracotomy performed to aid in the resuscitation of a major trauma patient who has sustained severe thoracic or abdominal trauma. The procedure allows immediate direct access to the thoracic cavity, permitting rescuers to control hemorrhage, relieve cardiac tamponade, repair or control major injuries to the heart, lungs or thoracic vasculature, and perform direct cardiac massage or defibrillation. The procedure is rarely performed and is a procedure of last resort.

== Indications ==
A resuscitative thoracotomy is indicated when severe injuries within the thoracic cavity (such as hemorrhage) prevent the physiologic functions needed to sustain life. The injury may also affect a specific organ such as the heart, which can develop an air embolism or a cardiac tamponade (which prevents the heart from beating properly). The primary indication for a resuscitative thoracotomy is a patient with penetrating chest trauma who has entered or is about to enter cardiac arrest. Other indications for the use of this procedure include the appearance of blood from a chest tube that returns more than 1500 mL of blood during the first hour of placement, or ≥200 mL of blood per hour two to four hours after placement.

For resuscitative thoracotomy to be indicated, signs of life must also be present, including cardiac electrical activity and a systolic blood pressure >70 mm Hg. In blunt trauma, if signs of life, such as eye dilatation, are found en route to the hospital by first responders, but not found when the patient arrives, then further resuscitative interventions are contraindicated; however; when first responders find signs of life (respiratory or motor effort, cardiac electrical activity, blood pressure, or pupillary activity) and cardiopulmonary resuscitation time is under 15 minutes, the procedure is indicated.

The use of a focused assessment with sonography for trauma may be performed to determine the need of the procedure by finding free floating fluid in the thoracic cavity.

== Technique ==
A left anterolateral thoracotomy is the common method of opening the chest, as it provides rapid access, can be easily extended into the right hemithorax, and provides access to most of the important anatomical structures during resuscitation including the aorta. First an incision is made along the fifth intercostal space (typically the intercostal space directly beneath the left nipple), intercostal muscles and the parietal pleura are divided, and then the ribs are retracted to provide visualization. When the incision covers both the right and left hemithoraxes it is referred to as a "clamshell" thoracotomy. The clamshell thoracotomy is used when there is a right sided pulmonary or vascular injury, or when greater access or visualization is desired.

== Recovery ==
Usually those who undergo resuscitative thoracotomy do not recover—only 10% of those receiving it after sustaining a blunt injury, and 15–30% of those with penetrating trauma survive. Patients with thoracic stab wounds and patients who arrive at the emergency department with signs of life are associated with the highest rates of survival. Patients with polytrauma and patients who present without signs of life are associated with the lowest rates of survival.

== History ==
The procedure was first utilized during the late 1800s by Moritz Schiff in conjunction with open cardiac massage. Shortly after it was also used by Block to treat heart lacerations, and the first suture repair performed in 1900. Before external defibrillation and cardiopulmonary resuscitation came in the 1960s, emergency thoracotomy was the preferred way to treat cardiac arrest.
