= Hugh Morriston Davies =

Welsh thoracic surgeon (1879–1965)

Hugh Morriston Davies (10 August 1879 – 4 February 1965) was a Welsh thoracic surgeon, the first to perform a dissection lobectomy in the world, and the first to perform a thoracoplasty in the United Kingdom, both firsts achieved in 1912.

== Early life and education ==
Hugh Morriston Davies born in Huntingdon, the son of William Morriston Davies, a doctor from near Swansea. He was a student at Winchester, Trinity College Cambridge, and University College Hospital in London. He earned a medical degree from Cambridge in 1907, with a thesis titled "The Functions of the Trigeminal Nerve", and became a fellow of the Royal College of Surgeons in 1908.

== Career ==
Hugh Morriston Davies became assistant surgeon at University College Hospital. He did some neurosurgical experiments with Wilfred Trotter in his early career. He grew interested in how the emerging science of radiology might be used to study chest diseases. In 1912, he became the first surgeon to remove a tumour in a lung diagnosed by using X-rays. In 1914 he was appointed to the London Chest Hospital. Morriston Davies was also talented at inventing useful devices for improving the surgical experience, including an innovative anesthetic tube design. Unfortunately, in 1916, Davies injured his right hand while performing a surgery; the damage from infection was so extensive that amputation was recommended. He did not, in the end, choose that course of treatment, but his career as a surgeon seemed no longer tenable.

In 1918, Davies began a new career as a sanatorium operator, at Llanbedr Hall near Ruthin. He also wrote the first English-language textbook on thoracic surgery. In time and with extraordinary effort, he trained himself to do surgery again, with his left hand predominating, and he returned to the operating theatre. He went on to publish two more texts, Medical and Surgical Treatment of Tuberculosis (1933), and War Injuries of the Chest (1940, co-edited with Robert Coope).

During World War II he was director of North West Thoracic Surgical Services, Broadgreen Hospital, Liverpool, where his responsibilities included training surgeons.

In 1954 he won the Weber-Parkes Prize from the Royal College of Physicians.

In 1960 he gave an extended interview about his career to BBC radio broadcasters.

== Personal life ==
Hugh Morriston Davies married Dorothy Lillian Courtney, the daughter of a doctor. They had two daughters. He retired to Llanarmon-yn-Iâl in 1959, and died there in 1965, age 85.

Today there is a Scadding-Morriston Davies Joint Fellowship in Respiratory Medicine, for British medical students interested in the speciality, named partly in his memory.
