= Georg Kelling =

German surgeon

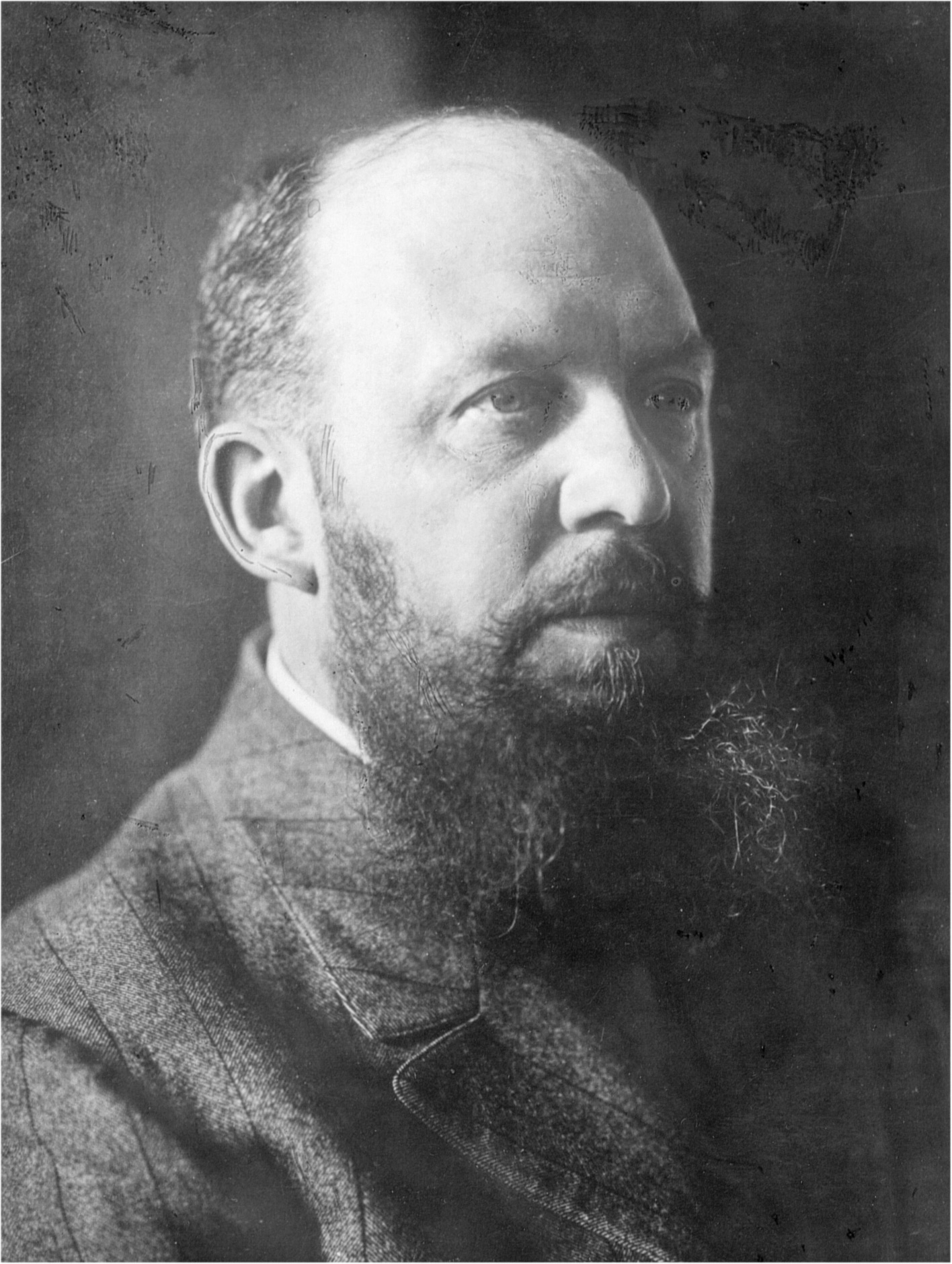
Georg Kelling (1866-1945)

Georg Kelling (7 July 1866 – 14 February 1945) was a German internist and surgeon who was a laparoscopy pioneer and, in 1901, performed the first laparoscopic surgery on a dog.

He studied medicine at the Universities of Leipzig and Berlin. He earned his medical doctorate in 1890, and later worked as a physician at the city hospital in Dresden. In the 1890s, Kelling devised an esophagoscope

Kelling specialized in gastrointestinal physiology and anatomy. He is credited with performing the first laparoscopic examination, a procedure he referred to as "celioscopy". In 1901 he performed the procedure on the abdomen of a dog using a Nitze-cystoscope. Prior to cystoscopic viewing of the abdomen, Kelling insufflated it with filtered air via a device known as a trocar. Insufflation was used to create a pneumoperitoneum in order to prevent intra-abdominal bleeding.

Kelling and his wife were killed during the Allied bombing of Dresden in 1945.

== See also ==
- Hans Christian Jacobaeus
