= Pleurodesis =

Medical procedure on pleural cavity

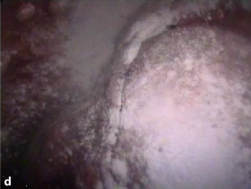
- Malignant pleural mesothelioma managed by talc pleurodesis. Video assisted thoracoscopic view.
- ICD-9-CM: 34.92
- MeSH: D018700
- MedlinePlus: 002956

Pleurodesis is a medical procedure in which part of the pleural space is artificially obliterated. It involves the adhesion of the visceral and the costal pleura. The mediastinal pleura is spared.

== Uses ==
Pleurodesis is performed to prevent recurrence of spontaneous pneumothorax or pleural effusion, and can be done chemically or mechanically. It is generally avoided in patients with cystic fibrosis if possible, because lung transplantation becomes more difficult following this procedure. Previous pneumothorax with or without pleurodesis is not a contraindication to subsequent lung transplantation.

=== Chemical ===
Chemicals such as bleomycin, tetracycline (e.g., minocycline), povidone-iodine, or a slurry of talc can be introduced into the pleural space through a chest drain. The instilled chemicals cause irritation between the parietal and the visceral layers of the pleura which closes off the space between them and prevents further fluid from accumulating. Pharmacy-prepared chemicals for pleurodesis should be clearly labeled "NOT FOR IV ADMINISTRATION" to avoid potentially fatal wrong-site medication errors.

Sterile talc powder, administered intrapleurally via a chest tube, is indicated as a sclerosing agent to decrease the recurrence of malignant pleural effusions in symptomatic patients. It is usually performed at the time of a diagnostic thoracoscopy.

Povidone iodine is equally effective and safe as talc, and may be preferred because of easy availability and low cost.

Chemical pleurodesis is a painful procedure, and so patients are often premedicated with a sedative and analgesics. A local anesthetic may be instilled into the pleural space, or an epidural catheter may be placed for anesthesia.

=== Surgical ===
Surgical pleurodesis, also known as mechanical or abrasive pleurodesis, may be performed via thoracotomy or thoracoscopy. This involves mechanically irritating the apical and the costal pleura, often with a scratchpad (a small foam pad with coated abrasive) normally used for cleaning electrocautery blade tips. Moreover, surgical removal of parietal pleura is an effective way of achieving stable pleurodesis.

Alternatively, tunneled pleural catheters (TPCs) may be placed in an outpatient setting and often result in auto-pleurodesis, whereby portable vacuum bottles are used to evacuate the pleural fluid. Routine evacuation keeps the pleura together, resulting in physical agitation by the catheter, which slowly causes the pleura to scar together. This method, though the minimally invasive and minimal cost solution, takes an average of about 30 days to achieve pleurodesis and is therefore the slowest means of achieving pleurodesis among other modalities.

Conservative management of primary spontaneous pneumothorax is noninferior to interventional management, with a lower risk of serious adverse events.
