= Lung lobectomy =

Surgical removal of a lobe of a lung

Lobectomy (lung)
- ICD-9-CM: 32.49

Lobectomy of the lung is a surgical operation where a lobe of the lung is removed. It is done to remove a portion of diseased lung, such as early stage lung cancer.

== Administration ==
The most common type of lobectomy is known as a thoracotomy. When this type of surgery is done the chest is opened up. An incision will be made on the side of the chest where the affected area of the lung is located. The incision will be in between the two ribs located in that area. The surgeon will then be able to have access to the chest cavity once the two involved ribs have been pried open. The surgeon will then be able to remove the lobe where the problem is contained. Another less invasive lobectomy procedure can be performed through a video assisted surgery, where the surgeon does not need to pry the two ribs open in order to get access. A few small incisions are made and surgical tools are inserted into the chest cavity aided by a small video camera. The video images will be projected onto a screen that the surgeon can see. Once the problem area is located the small tools that were previously inserted will be utilized to perform the surgery. Once the surgery is complete, the patient will remain in the intensive care unit of the hospital for a day. They will then remain in a regular hospital room for about 4 to 7 days.

== Risks ==
As with any surgery, complications may occur. Post lobectomy air leak is a significant clinical problem, and patients undergoing pulmonary resections often present with postoperative air leaks. Other risk factors include infections, reactions to anesthesia, bleeding, pneumothorax and bronchopleural fistula. New methods for sealing tissue are evaluated in research studies, aimed to determine their efficacies in preventing air leakages.

The main infection that a patient runs the risk of is pneumonia. Pneumothorax occurs when there is air trapped between the lung and the chest wall; this can leave the patient's lung unable to fully inflate ("collapsed lung"). A bronchopleural fistula is when there is a tube-like opening that allows air to escape. Minimally invasive surgery is beneficial for patient outcome, with reduced risk of complications.

== Post-surgery ==
Once the surgery is complete, the patient will remain in the intensive care unit of the hospital for a day. They will then remain in a regular hospital room for about 4 to 7 days. After the patient returns home, they typically remain in recovery for about four to six weeks, although some patients may be able to return to work and normal activities sooner. Pain is very common amongst patients for quite some time after a lobectomy and doctors will usually prescribe pain medication to help with this. After a minimally invasive lobectomy, they may receive a chest-wall nerve block which may ease pain on the first day. Chest tubes are left inside the patient in order to help excess fluid drain and are removed after a few days. Before removal, doctors must ensure that there is no air or fluid leaking from them. In addition to this, follow-up appointments will be scheduled with the patient's doctor. X-rays will be taken of the patient's lung to make sure everything is healing properly. Patients that have had a lobectomy with no major risks shall recover in no longer than three months.

Removal of one lobe of the lung

Removal of two lobes of the lung

== See also ==
- Lung volume reduction surgery
