= Endobronchial valve =

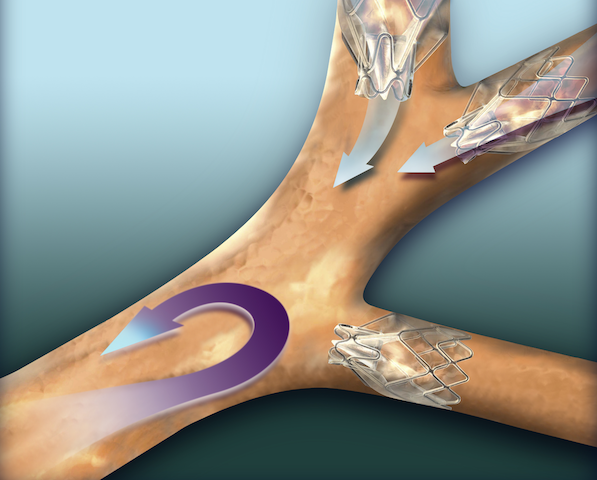
Endobronchial valve

An endobronchial valve (EBV) is a small, one-way valve, which may be implanted in an airway feeding the lung or part of lung. The valve allows air to be breathed out of the section of lung supplied, and prevents air from being breathed in. This leaves the rest of the lung to expand more normally and avoid air-trapping. Endobronchial valves are typically implanted using a flexible delivery catheter advanced through a bronchoscope in minimally invasive bronchoscopic lung volume reduction procedures in the treatment of severe emphysema. The valves are also removable if they are not working properly.

== Mechanism ==
The one-way endobronchial valve is typically implanted such that on exhalation air is able to flow through the valve and out of the lung compartment that is fed by that airway, but on inhalation, the valve closes and blocks air from entering that lung compartment. Thus, an implanted endobronchial valve typically helps a lung compartment to empty itself of air. This has been shown to be beneficial in the treatment of emphysema, where lungs lose their elasticity and thus cannot contract sufficiently to exhale air, leading to air trapping and hyperinflation. When one or more diseased portions of an emphysematous lung are made to deflate and collapse, other healthier portions of the lung have more room in the chest cavity to inhale and exhale, pressure is removed from the diaphragm, and even the heart may function better as the hyperinflated lung becomes smaller. The amount of residual volume reduction achieved, correlates with the effects on FEV1, quality of life and exercise capacity. Endobronchial valves have also been shown to be beneficial in treatment of persistent air leaks in the lungs. Their use in the treatment of tuberculosis and its complications has been studied resulting in promising outcomes but further studies are needed. Endobronchial valves may be the first successful medical device treatment of emphysema, a disease that affects millions of people worldwide and has no known cure, being managed traditionally by lung transplantation and/or lung volume reduction surgery (though some people do not meet the eligibility requirements for one or both of these invasive procedures).

== History ==
Although endobronchial isolation techniques for emphysema were developed in the early 2000s, specific valves were developed primarily by the start-up medical device company Emphasys Medical (now Pulmonx - Redwood City, California) as a minimally invasive alternative to lung volume reduction surgery for emphysema. In lung volume reduction surgery, one or more diseased portion(s) of a lung are excised. Endobronchial valves were designed to replicate the effects of that procedure without requiring incisions, by simply allowing the most diseased portions of the lung to collapse. Emphasys was purchased by Pulmonx in 2009, and Pulmonx currently markets the Zephyr® endobronchial valve (developed by Emphasys) in Europe, Australia, China and many other locations outside the U.S. Pulmonx also sells the Chartis® Pulmonary Assessment System, which is an assessment tool used with endobronchial valves to help physicians target appropriate lung compartments for treatment. Another company, Spiration (Seattle, Washington), developed a different type of endobronchial valve and was acquired by Olympus in 2010.
