= Video-assisted thoracoscopic surgery =

- Diagram showing video assisted thoracoscopy (VATS)
- MeSH: D020775

Video-assisted thoracoscopic surgery (VATS) is a type of minimally invasive thoracic surgery performed using a small video camera mounted to a fiberoptic thoracoscope (either 5 mm or 10 mm caliber), with or without angulated visualization, which allows the surgeon to see inside the chest by viewing the video images relayed onto a television screen, and perform procedures using elongated surgical instruments. The camera and instruments are inserted into the patient's chest cavity through small incisions in the chest wall, usually via specially designed guiding tubes known as "ports".

VATS procedures are done using either conventional surgical instruments or laparoscopic instruments. Unlike with laparoscopy, carbon dioxide insufflation is not generally required in VATS due to the inherent rigidity of the thoracic cage. However, lung deflation on the side of the operated chest is a must to be able to visualize and pass instruments into the thorax; this is usually effected with a double-lumen endotracheal tube that allows for single-lung ventilation, or a one-side bronchial occlusion delivered via a standard single-lumen tracheal tube.

== History ==
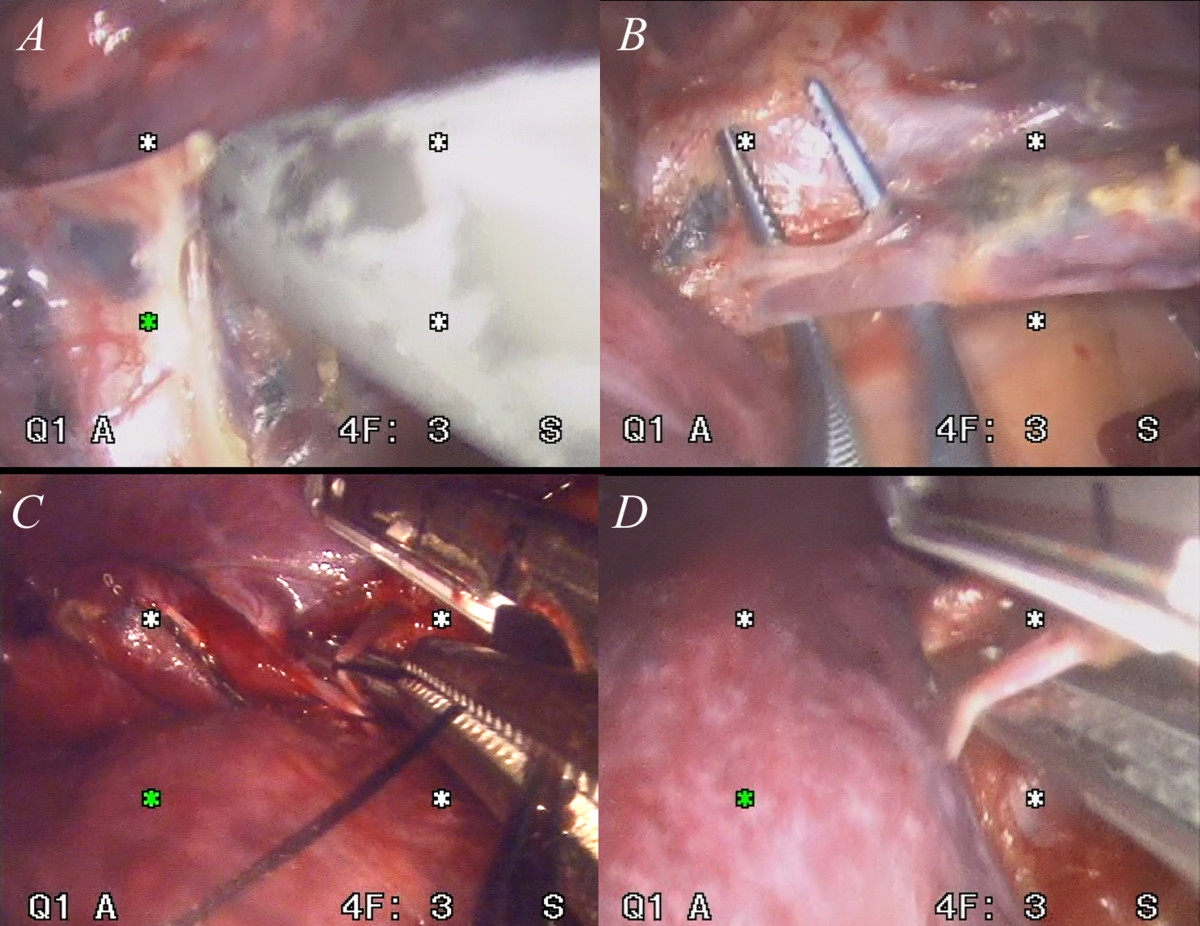
Views during a VATS lobectomy procedure

VATS came into widespread use beginning in the early 1990s after being pioneered by Dr. Ralph J. Lewis. Operations that traditionally were carried out with thoracotomy or sternotomy that today can be performed with VATS include: biopsy for diagnosis of pulmonary, pleural or mediastinal pathology; decortication for empyema; pleurodesis for recurrent pleural effusions or spontaneous pneumothorax; surgical stapler-assisted wedge resection of lung masses; resection of mediastinal or pleural masses; thoracic sympathectomy for hyperhidrosis; operations for diaphragmatic hernias or paralysis; esophageal resection or resection of esophageal masses or diverticula; and VATS lobectomy/mediastinal lymphadenectomy for lung cancer.

Similarly to laparoscopy, VATS has enjoyed widespread use for technically straightforward operations such as pulmonary decortication, pleurodesis, and lung or pleural biopsies, while more technically demanding operations such as esophageal operations, mediastinal mass resections, or pulmonary lobectomy for early stage lung cancer, have been slower to catch on and have tended to remain confined to selected centers. It is expected that advanced VATS techniques will continue to grow in numbers spurred by patient demand and greater surgeon comfort and familiarity with the techniques.

== Benefits ==
The main advantage of VATS is that the smaller postoperative wounds drastically reduce the risk for wound infection and dehiscence, which allows for a faster recovery by the patient and a greater chance for the wound to heal.

Traditional thoracic surgery requires opening the chest through thoracotomy or sternotomy incisions, which are significantly traumatic to the body. Sternotomy requires the use of a sternal saw to split the sternum and a retractor to spread apart the divided sternum to allow visualization and access to the thoracic structures. Thoracotomy, as most commonly performed, requires division of one or more major muscles of the chest wall including the latissimus, pectoralis or serratus muscles, along with spreading of the ribs with a rib spreader. Because the costovertebral joints have only limited flexibility, the use of a rib spreader usually results in iatrogenic rib fractures, which can lead to complications like a flail chest or intercostal neuralgia. Because of this, thoracic surgeons generally intentionally use a bone cutter to remove section of one or more ribs in an effort to prevent jagged rib fractures. Although sternotomy and thoracotomy have been proven over decades to provide highly effective access to thoracic structures and in general are tolerated by patients, both incisions have the potential for causing significant pain that may last for extended periods and both prevent the patients from heavy lifting or strenuous activity for weeks in order to heal, and can still result in malunions and nonunions. The great advantage of VATS over sternotomy or thoracotomy is the avoidance of muscle division and bone-cutting, which allows for reduced postoperative pain, shorter duration of hospital stay and quicker return to full activity.

== See also ==
- Thoracic surgery
- VATS lobectomy
