= Thoracotomy =

Surgical procedure to access the interior of the chest

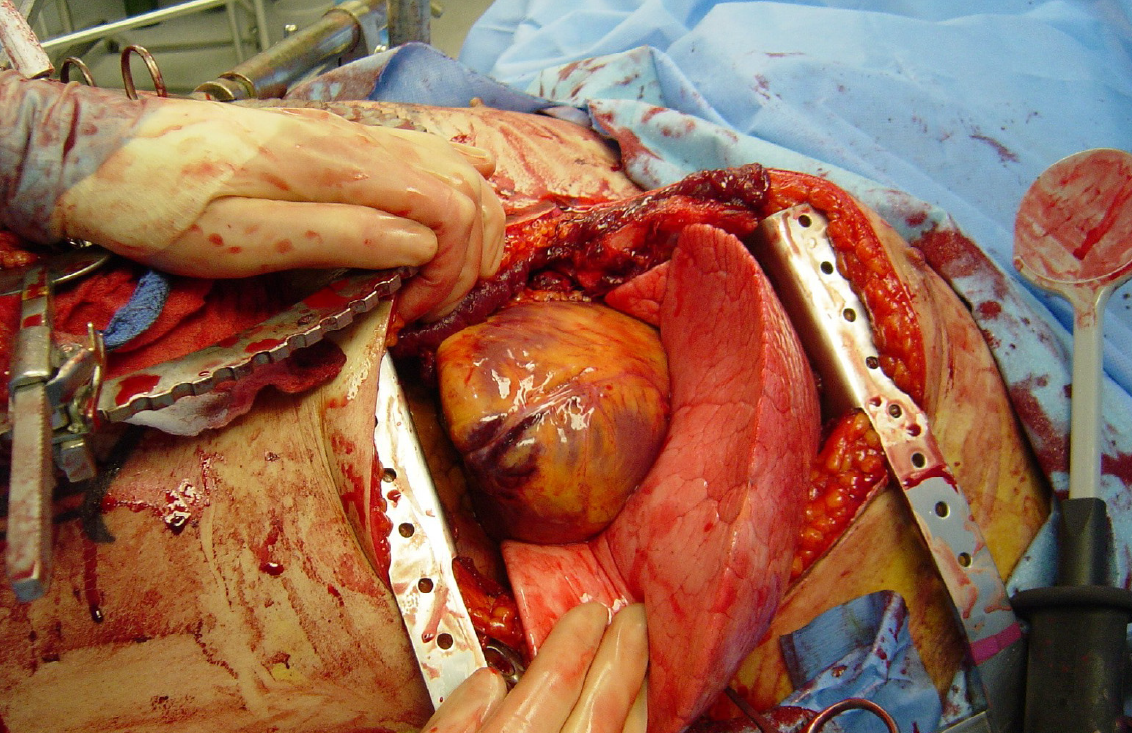
- A left anterolateral thoracotomy exposing the heart and lung. A Harken retractor (rib spreader) is being used to increase visibility
- ICD-9-CM: 34.02
- MeSH: D013908

A thoracotomy is a surgical procedure that involves cutting open the chest wall to gain access into the pleural cavity. It is mostly performed by specialist cardiothoracic surgeons, although emergency physicians or paramedics occasionally also perform the procedure under life-threatening circumstances.

The procedure is performed under general anesthesia with double-lumen intubation, and commonly with epidural analgesia set up pre-sedation for postoperative pain management. The procedure starts with controlled cutting through the skin, intercostal muscles and then parietal pleura, and typically involves transecting at least one rib with a costotome due to the limited range of bucket handle movement each rib has without fracturing. The incised wound is then spread and held apart with a retractor (rib spreader) to allow passage of surgical instruments and the surgeon's hand. Traditional thoracotomy is thus a highly invasive procedure, with bacterial pneumonia, hemothorax/pleural effusion/air leak and intercostal neuralgia being common postoperative complications. However, some recent techniques can perform achieve thoracic access with a smaller incision (usually less than 10 cm or 3.9 in) and no rib cutting, and are often called a mini-thoracotomy (not to be confused with the minimally invasive thoracoscopy).

The purpose of thoracotomy is to gain direct-vision access to intrathoracic organs, most commonly the lungs, the heart and/or the esophagus, as well as access to the thoracic aorta, the anterior spine or even merely to resect portions of the chest wall for neoplasms (e.g. mesothelioma, sarcoma or fibroma) and deformities (e.g. flail chest, pectus carinatum or excavatum). It is the first step in common thoracic surgeries including lobectomy or pneumonectomy for lung cancer, drainage and decortication for empyema, diaphragm repairs, or to gain thoracic access in major trauma. Postoperative care of thoracotomy typically involves intensive care monitoring, chest tube drainage and chest physiotherapy.

== Approaches ==
There are many different surgical approaches to performing a thoracotomy. Some common forms of thoracotomies include:

- Posterolateral thoracotomy is the most common and traditional approach for gaining access to the chest. It is an incision through an intercostal space on the back, and is often widened with rib spreaders. Patient has to be placed in a lateral decubitus position for this approach. All pressure points should be padded. A pillow should be placed between the legs. Both arms should be flexed and maintained in "prayer position". A roll can be placed under the 5th intercostal space or the table can be broken at the same level so as to open the intercostal space widely for easy access. It is a very common approach for operations on the lung or posterior mediastinum, including the esophagus. When performed over the fifth intercostal space, it allows optimal access to the pulmonary hilum (pulmonary artery and pulmonary vein) and therefore is considered the approach of choice for pulmonary resection (pneumonectomy and lobectomy). Another variant is the "muscle sparing posterolateral thoracotomy" which preserves the Lattisimus Dorsi and Serratus muscles. This leads to less shoulder dysfunction and also allows for these muscles for any future use in case of a complication.
- Anterolateral thoracotomy is performed upon the anterior chest wall. The skin incision is performed starting from the posterior axillary line in front of the tip of the scapula towards the submammary crease. The anterior intercostal spaces are wider as compared to the posterior spaces hence provide better exposure while minimising the need for excess rib spreading. It gives a very adequate exposure of lungs, pericardium and diaphragm. Left anterolateral thoracotomy is the incision of choice for open chest massage, a critical maneuver in the management of traumatic cardiac arrest.
- Bilateral anterior thoracotomy with transverse sternotomy, or clamshell incision, is the incision of choice for bilateral lung transplantation. It is also a valuable tool in trauma settings. Large mediastinal tumours extending into both hemi-thorax and bilateral pulmonary tumours are also easily accessible via a clamshell incision.
- The Ashrafian thoracotomy was devised to give rapid access to the heart and pericardium through an incision that consists of an anterior thoracic incision followed in a vertical direction along the costo-chondral (rib-cartilage) junction.

Upon completion of the surgical procedure, the chest is closed. One or more chest tubes—with one end inside the opened pleural cavity and the other submerged under saline solution inside a sealed container, forming an airtight drainage system—are necessary to remove air and fluid from the pleural cavity, preventing the development of pneumothorax or hemothorax.

== Complications ==
In addition to pneumothorax, complications from thoracotomy include air leaks, infection, bleeding and respiratory failure. Postoperative pain is universal and intense, generally requiring the use of opioid analgesics for moderation, as well as interfering with the recovery of respiratory function. Paraplegia complicating thoracotomy is rare but catastrophic.

In nearly all cases, one or more chest tubes are placed. These tubes are used to drain air and fluid until the patient heals enough to take them out (usually a few days). Complications such as pneumothorax, tension pneumothorax, or subcutaneous emphysema can occur if these chest tubes become clogged. Furthermore, complications such as pleural effusion or hemothorax can occur if the chest tubes fail to drain the fluid around the lung in the pleural space after a thoracotomy. Clinicians should be on the look out for chest tube clogging as these tubes have a tendency to become occluded with fibrinous material or clot in the post operative period, and when this happens, complications ensue.

Pain following a thoracotomy may be treated by the use of a nerve block known as a rhomboid intercostal block. In the long term, post-operative chronic pain can develop, known as thoracotomy pain syndrome, and may last from a few years to a lifetime. Treatment to aid pain relief for this condition includes intra-thoracic nerve blocks/opiates and epidurals, although results vary from person to person and are dependent on numerous factors. A recent Cochrane review concluded that there is moderate-quality evidence that regional anaesthesia may reduce the risk of developing persistent postoperative pain three to 18 months after thoracotomy.

== VATS ==
Video-assisted thoracoscopic surgery (VATS) is a less invasive alternative to thoracotomy in selected cases, much like laparoscopic surgery. There are lesser postoperative complications and better long-term survival following VATS lobectomy compared to open thoracotomy lobectomy for NSCLC. VATS lobectomy does not compromise patient safety or the oncological efficacy.

== Post-thoracotomy pain ==
Thoracic epidural analgesia or paravertebral blockade have shown to be the most effective methods for post-thoracotomy pain control. However, contraindications to neuraxial anesthesia include hypovolemia, shock, increase in ICP, coagulopathy or thrombocytopenia, sepsis, or infection at puncture site. Comparing thoracic epidural analgesia and paravertebral blockade, paravertebral blockade reduced the risks of developing minor complications, however paravertebral blockade was as effective as thoracic epidural blockade in controlling acute pain. Transcutaneous electrical nerve stimulation has also shown to be useful in the management of post-thoracotomy pain. Specifically, it has been found to be a good adjunct in the management of moderate to severe post-thoracotomy pain and effective as a lone modality in mild post-thoracotomy pain (e.g. after video-assisted thoracoscopy). Evidence from a 2025 systematic review suggests that, in chest surgery, nerve blocks can offer small short-term reductions in pain or opioid use.

== See also ==
- List of surgeries by type
