= Lobectomy =

Surgical excision of a lobe

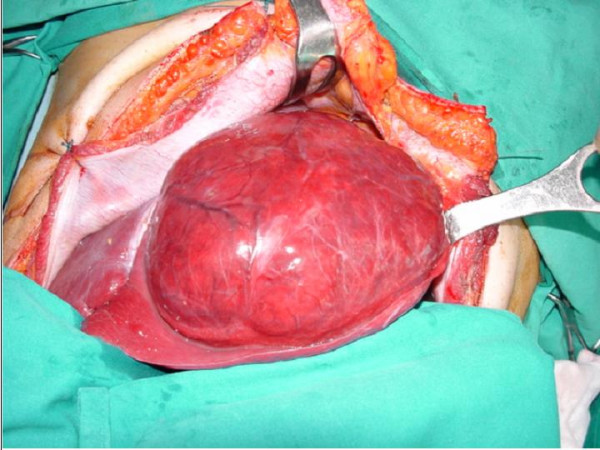
- Removal of a giant hepatocellular adenoma via lobectomy of left liver lobe
- Specialty: Cardiothoracic surgery

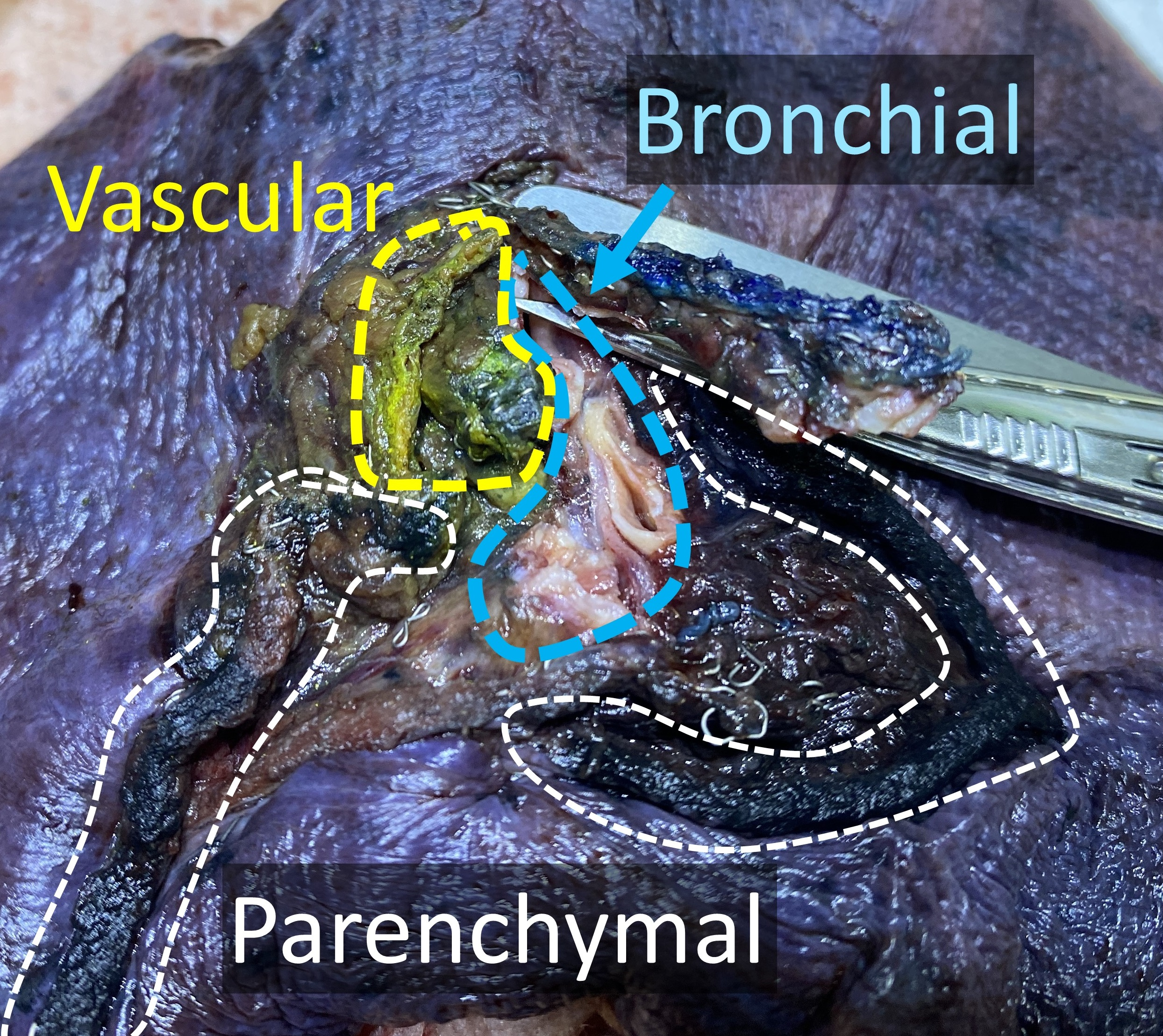
Vascular, bronchial and parenchymal margins of a lobectomy, showing staple line of bronchial margin being removed with scissors.

Lobectomy is the surgical excision of a lobe, such as a lobe of the lung (also simply called a lobectomy), a lobe of the thyroid (hemithyroidectomy), a lobe of the brain (as in anterior temporal lobectomy), or a lobe of the liver (hepatectomy).

== Medical uses ==
=== Lung lobectomy ===
A lobectomy of the lung is performed in early-stage non-small cell lung cancer patients. It is not performed on patients that have lung cancer that has spread to other parts of the body. Tumor size, type, and location are major factors as to whether a lobectomy is performed. This can be due to cancer or smoking. Lung lobectomies are performed on patients as young as eleven or twelve who have no cancer or smoking history, but have conditions from birth or early childhood that necessitate the operation. Such patients will have reduced lung capacity which tends to limit their range of activities through life. They often need to use inhalers on a daily basis, and are often classified as being asthmatic.

Infectious Causes:When chronic lung infections don't improve with antibiotics, surgery may be needed. Tuberculosis is the most common reason for lobectomy worldwide. In select cases with complications like cavities or localized bronchiectasis, surgery can be performed after medical treatment, though it comes with higher risk and requires careful follow-up.

Non-Infectious Causes:Lobectomy may be used to treat congenital lung defects such as bronchial atresia, pulmonary sequestration, or cystic lung malformations. It’s also an option for controlling severe bleeding (hemoptysis) caused by conditions like aspergilloma or vascular abnormalities. In trauma cases involving damage to major lung vessels or airways, lobectomy may be life-saving but carries a high risk of complications.

Cancer-Related Causes:Lobectomy is the preferred surgical treatment for Stage I–II non–small cell lung cancer, most commonly performed on the right upper lobe. It can also be used for certain rare tumors or when cancer has spread to a limited area of the lung.

== Contraindications ==
Patient selection plays a key role in lobectomy outcomes. Individuals with poor lung function (FEV1 under 800 cc or DLCO below 40%) are considered high-risk and may be better suited for limited resection or non-surgical options. Lobectomy is also not recommended for people who have had recent heart attacks, serious heart conditions, or large tumors over 6 cm, due to increased difficulty and risk.

== Techniques ==
=== Video-assisted Thoracic Surgery (VATS) Lobectomy ===
A VATS lobectomy (Video-Assisted Thoracoscopic Surgery lobectomy) is a minimally invasive procedure used to remove a lung lobe, commonly for treating lung cancer or other pulmonary conditions.

Instead of the large incision required in traditional open surgery, the surgeon makes 2 to 4 smaller incisions in the chest, typically ranging from 1 to 2 centimeters in length. Through these incisions, a small, flexible camera known as a thoracoscope is inserted, along with specialized surgical instruments. The thoracoscope is equipped with a high-definition camera that captures detailed images of the inside of the chest. These images are transmitted in real-time to a monitor, providing the surgeon with a clear, magnified view of the lung and surrounding structures. This enhanced visualization allows for precise and controlled movements during the procedure, enabling the surgeon to perform the lobectomy with greater accuracy and less disruption to surrounding tissues.

The advantages of VATS lobectomy include less postoperative pain, shorter hospital stays, smaller scars, and a quicker recovery compared to traditional open thoracotomy. However, it demands a high level of skill and experience, and patients with large tumors or widespread disease may require alternative surgical approaches.

=== Robotic-Assisted Lobectomy ===
The first robotic-assisted lobectomies (RALs) were reported by Morgan and Ashton in 2003 who had performed them in adults in the United States and in Europe. Since then, the use of this technique has steadily increased. By 2015, more than 6,000 RALs had been carried out in the United States, with over 8,600 performed globally.

The da Vinci system, which is currently the only robotic system approved by the U.S. Food and Drug Administration (FDA) for performing lung surgery, improves on thoracoscopic surgery with 3D, high-magnification imaging and robotic arms that mimic wrist movement, filter tremors, and allow for precise tissue dissection and vessel control. As of 2025, there are other FDA-approved robotic systems also in use.

Surgical resection is recommended for Stage I and II lung cancer, and selected Stage III cases, with lobectomy and lymph node evaluation as the standard approach. Preoperative assessments include imaging (CT, PET, EBUS or mediastinoscopy) and pulmonary function tests to ensure the patient can safely undergo surgery.[12] Robotic lobectomy is complex and not recommended for beginner robotic surgeons. It's advised to start with simpler Level I procedures (e.g., wedge resections, lymph node biopsies) before moving on to intermediate Level II cases and finally advanced Level III operations like lobectomies and esophagectomies. Early robotic lung resections should be carefully selected to ensure safety and support learning. Ideal early cases involve small (<5 cm), peripheral tumors with no lymph node calcification, complete fissures, normal bronchoscopy, and no prior chest surgery or radiation. As experience grows, more complex procedures can be added, with prior VATS experience being helpful but not required.
