= Wedge resection (lung) =

Surgical operation

- ICD-9-CM: 32.29

Wedge resection of the lung is a surgical operation where a part of a lung is removed. It is done to remove a localized portion of diseased lung, such as early stage lung cancer.
