= Pneumonectomy =

Surgical removal of a lung

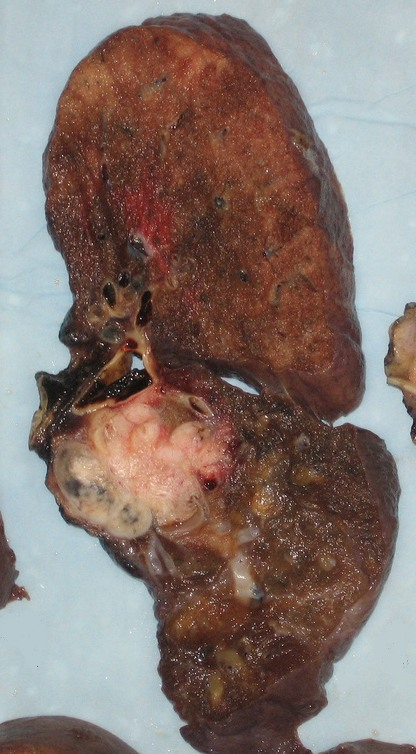
- Appearance of the cut surface of a pneumonectomy specimen containing lung cancer, here a squamous cell carcinoma (the whitish tumor near the bronchi).
- ICD-9-CM: 32.5
- MeSH: D011013

A pneumonectomy (or pneumectomy) is a surgical procedure to remove a lung. It was first successfully performed in 1933 by Dr. Evarts Graham. This is not to be confused with a lobectomy or segmentectomy, which only removes one part of the lung.

There are two types of pneumonectomy: simple and extrapleural. A simple pneumonectomy removes just the lung. An extrapleural pneumonectomy also takes away part of the diaphragm, the parietal pleura, and the pericardium on that side.

== Indications ==
The most common reason for a pneumonectomy is to remove tumorous tissue arising from lung cancer. Other reasons can arise are a traumatic lung injury, bronchiectasis, tuberculosis, a congenital defect, and fungal infections.

== Contraindications ==
=== Tests ===
The operation will reduce the respiratory capacity of the patient, and before conducting a pneumonectomy, survivability after the removal has to be assessed. If at all possible, a pulmonary function test (PFT) should be done. It has been found that forced expiratory volume in one second (FEV1) and diffusion capacity of the lungs (DLCO) provides the best indicator of survival. Other tools can be used to assess effectiveness as well, such as cardiopulmonary exercise testing to measure maximal oxygen consumption (VO_{2} max), stair climbing, shuttle walk test, and a 6-minute walk test.

=== Pathologies ===
If someone has severe valvular disease, severe pulmonary hypertension, or poor ventricular function or if cancer has spread from the lungs into the other intra-abdominal structures, ribs, or contralateral hemithorax, it is contraindicated.

== Surgical approach ==
Posterolateral thoracotomy using the fourth or fifth intercostal space is the most common approach used for pneumonectomy. In case of inflammatory and infectious indications, excision of the fifth rib may be necessary to achieve adequate surgical exposure if there is rib crowding.

Video-assisted thoracoscopic surgery (VATS) approach: VATS pneumonectomy is a safe and feasible treatment for advanced malignant and benign diseases and has lower morbidity.

Robotic pneumonectomy for lung cancer is a safe procedure and a reasonable alternative to thoracotomy. With a sound technique most procedures can be completed robotically without any major complications.

== Anatomical changes ==
After a pneumonectomy is performed, changes in the thoracic cavity occur to compensate for the altered anatomy. The remaining lung hyperinflates as well as shifting over along with the heart towards the now empty space. This space is full of air initially after surgery, but then it is absorbed, and fluid eventually takes its place. The fluid which fills the residual space in the chest cavity slowly gelatinizes into a proteinaceous material, and the chest scaffold collapses slightly.

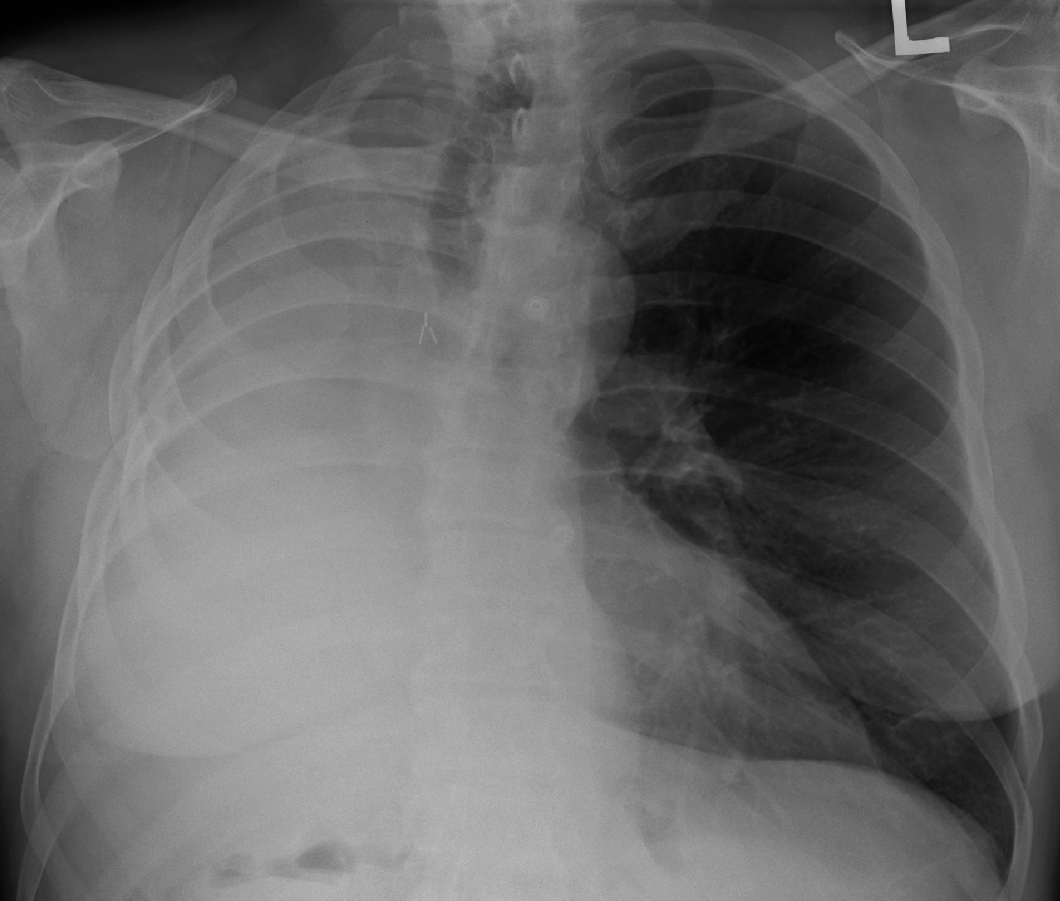
X-ray of a person who has had their right lung removed. Note how fluid has replaced the lung

== Living with one lung ==
As with the kidneys, it is often possible for a person to live with just one lung. Although it is not possible for the lung to re-grow like the liver, the body is able to compensate for the reduced lung capacity by slow and gradual expansion of the other remaining lung. Post-pneumonectomy patients in due time reach about 70–80 percent of their pre-surgery lung function. People have been able to return to near-normal lives, including running marathons after a pneumonectomy, provided there has been adequate cardio-pulmonary conditioning.

== Complications ==
Most common complications after a pneumonectomy are:

- Cardiac arrhythmias
- Pulmonary complications like pneumonia, atelectasis, respiratory failure
- Bronchopleural fistula
- Injury to the diaphragm, liver, spleen, or a major vessel
- Postpneumonectomy pulmonary edema
- Postpneumonectomy cardiac herniation

== History ==
Diagram showing the parts removed in a pneumonectomy

=== Pioneering dates ===
- 1895: first pneumonectomy in multiple stages by William Macewen on a patient with tuberculosis and emphysema
- 1912: first anatomical dissection lobectomy by Hugh Morriston Davies
- 1918: first successful lobectomy, by Harold Brunn
- 1931: first successful pneumonectomy in two stages by Rudolph Nissen on a patient with crush injury to the thorax
- 1933: first successful single-stage total pneumonectomy by Graham and Singer
- 1939: first segmentectomy, by Churchill and Belsey

== See also ==
- Medical ventilator
- List of surgeries by type
