= Hans Christian Jacobaeus =

Swedish internist (1879–1937)

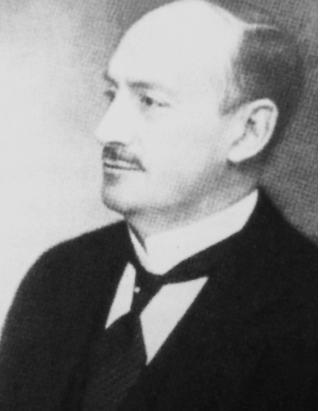
Hans Christian Jacobaeus.

Hans Christian Jacobaeus (29 May 1879 – 29 October 1937) was a Swedish internist born in Skarhult.

In 1916 he became a professor at the Karolinska Institutet in Stockholm. From 1925 until his death in 1937, he was a member of the Nobel Prize Committee.

Jacobaeus was an important figure in regards to modern laparoscopy and thoracoscopy. In 1910 he is credited with performing the first thoracoscopic diagnosis with a cystoscope, being used on a patient with tubercular intra-thoracic adhesions. In 1910, he published an article titled Über die Möglichkeit die Zystoskopie bei Untersuchung seröser Höhlungen anzuwenden (The Possibilities for Performing Cystoscopy in Examinations of Serous Cavities) in the journal Münchner Medizinischen Wochenschrift.

He also did pioneer work involving abdominal endoscopy, which he called laparoscopy. The term "laparoscopy" was introduced into clinical medicine and is used up to now although Jacobaeus initially called the procedure "cystoscopy" of the serious cavities. He understood the possibilities, as well as the limitations of the procedure, and was an advocate of endoscopic training for medical personnel. He also stressed the need for specialized instruments for optimum performance during laparoscopic examinations. Jacobaeus' initial experience with abdominal endoscopy (laparoscopy) as described in Münch Med Wochenschr in 1910, was basically limited to the patients with ascites (17 patients), he reported only about two cases without ascites.

In 1912, Jacobaeus published in Germany an extensive work on new technique - he gave an exact description of the patients' conditions and the 97 laparoscopies performed between 1910 and 1912 in Stockholm's community hospital.

In 1901 Dresden physician Georg Kelling (1866–1945) performed a cystoscope-aided intervention of a dog's abdomen. Kelling also claimed to have performed two successful laparoscopic examinations on humans prior to Jacobaeus, but nonetheless failed to timely publish his experiences.

Hans Christian Jacobaeus was the father of Christian Jacobæus, a Swedish electrical engineer.

== The Jacobæus Prize ==
The Jacobæus Prize, (also known as the "Jacobaeus Prize") is regarded as a prestigious recognition within the field of medical research. It is an annual award given to individuals who have made significant contributions to the advancement of medical science, particularly in the areas of physiology or endocrinology.

The prize was established to commemorate the legacy of Hans Christian Jacobæus, whose innovative work in the early 20th century laid the groundwork for minimally invasive surgery techniques. The award is sponsored by the Novo Nordisk Foundation.
