= Thoracoscopy =

Internal medical examination

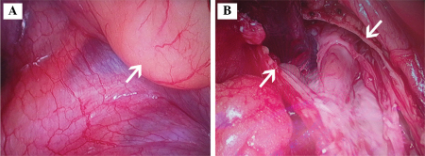
- Thoracoscopic views of a huge mediastinal lymphangioma before surgery.
- Specialty: Pulmonary
- ICD-9-CM: 34.21
- MeSH: D013906
- OPS-301 code: 1-691.0

Thoracoscopy is a medical procedure involving internal examination, biopsy and/or resection/drainage of disease or masses within the pleural cavity, usually with video assistance. Thoracoscopy may be performed either under general anaesthesia or under sedation with local anaesthetic.

== History ==
Thoracoscopy was first performed by Sir Francis Cruise of the Mater Misericordiae Hospital in Dublin in conjunction with Dr Samuel Gordon in 1865. It was further developed by Hans Christian Jacobaeus, a Swedish internist in 1910 for the treatment of tuberculous intra-thoracic adhesions. He used a cystoscope to examine the thoracic cavity, developing his technique over the next twenty years. Today, thoracoscopy is performed using specialized thoracoscopes. These instruments include a light source and a lens for viewing and may have ports through which other instruments may be inserted for the purpose of tissue removal and manipulation.

== Video-assisted thoracoscopic surgery ==
Video-assisted thoracoscopic surgery (VATS) is a surgical operation involving thoracoscopy, usually performed by a thoracic surgeon using general or local/regional anaesthesia with additional sedation as necessary. It has historically also been referred to as pleuroscopy. A wide variety of diagnostic and therapeutic procedures may be performed with this technique which has become very popular and increasingly so since the early 1990s. Prior to this, limited diagnostic procedures were done using variations on the cystoscope since 1910. Advances in direct optical visualization were quickly surpassed when video cameras were attached to the endoscopes. The advent of endoscopic stapling was also a major advance so that complicated procedures such as pulmonary lobectomy could be performed safely. VATS can be useful for the diagnosis of undefined interstitial lung diseases.

== See also ==
- Thoracic surgery
- Cardiothoracic surgery
- Video-assisted thoracoscopic surgery
- VATS lobectomy
