= Pulmonary laceration =

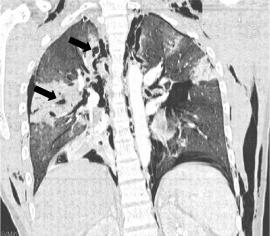
- Coronal CT scan showing lucencies (pale areas in radiography) in the lung caused by pulmonary lacerations on the left of the image (black arrows)
- Specialty: Cardiothoracic surgery, emergency medicine, trauma surgery

A pulmonary laceration is a chest injury in which lung tissue is torn or cut. An injury that is potentially more serious than pulmonary contusion, pulmonary laceration involves disruption of the architecture of the lung, while pulmonary contusion does not. Pulmonary laceration is commonly caused by penetrating trauma but may also result from forces involved in blunt trauma such as shear stress. A cavity filled with blood, air, or both can form. The injury is diagnosed when collections of air or fluid are found on a CT scan of the chest. Surgery may be required to stitch the laceration, to drain blood, or even to remove injured parts of the lung. The injury commonly heals quickly with few problems if it is given proper treatment; however it may be associated with scarring of the lung or other complications.

== Presentation ==
=== Complications ===
Complications are not common but include infection, lung abscess, and bronchopleural fistula (a fistula between the pleural space and the bronchial tree). A bronchopleural fistula results when there is a communication between the laceration, a bronchiole, and the pleura; it can cause air to leak into the pleural space despite the placement of a chest tube. The laceration can also enlarge, as may occur when the injury creates a valve that allows air to enter the laceration, progressively expanding it. One complication, air embolism, in which air enters the bloodstream, is potentially fatal, especially when it occurs on the left side of the heart. Air can enter the circulatory system through a damaged vein in the injured chest and can travel to any organ; it is especially deadly in the heart or brain. Positive pressure ventilation can cause pulmonary embolism by forcing air out of injured lungs and into blood vessels.

== Causes ==
Pulmonary laceration is a common result of penetrating trauma but may also be caused by blunt trauma; broken ribs may perforate the lung, or the tissue may be torn due to shearing forces that result from different rates of acceleration or deceleration of different tissues of the lung. Violent compression of the chest can cause lacerations by rupturing or shearing the lung tissue. Pulmonary laceration may result from blunt and penetrating forces that occur in the same injury and may be associated with pulmonary contusion. Lacerations of the lung tissue can also occur by compression of the alveoli against the ribs or spine. As with contusions, pulmonary lacerations usually occur near solid structures in the chest such as ribs. Pulmonary laceration is suspected when rib fractures are present.

== Pathophysiology ==
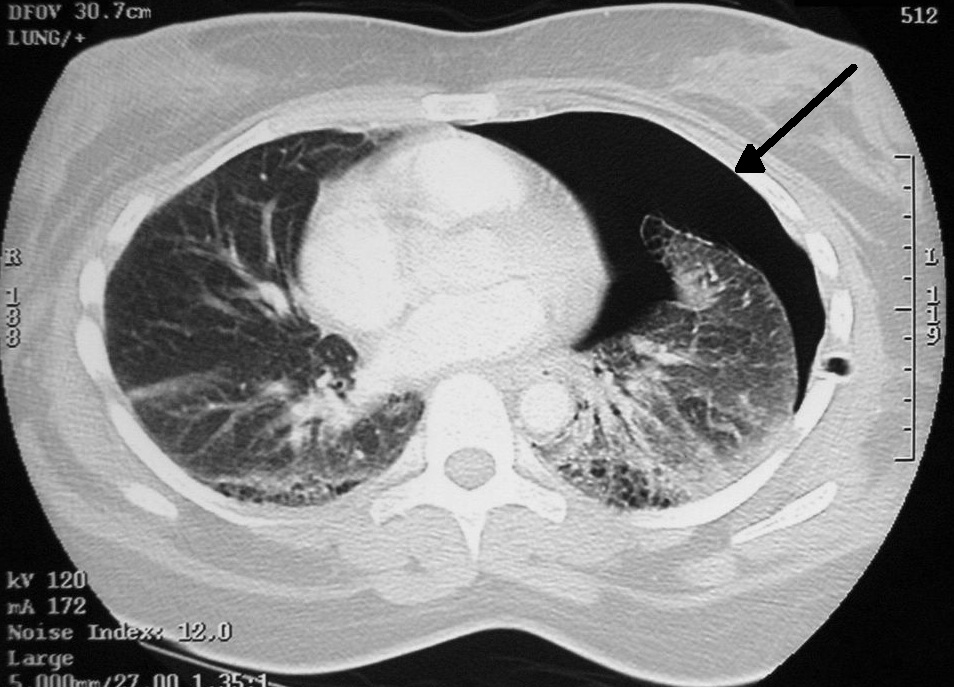
A CT scan of a pneumothorax, a chest injury that may accompany pulmonary laceration

A pulmonary laceration can cause air to leak out of the lacerated lung and into the pleural space, if the laceration goes through to it. Pulmonary laceration invariably results in pneumothorax (due to torn airways), hemothorax (due to torn blood vessels), or a hemopneumothorax (with both blood and air in the chest cavity). Unlike hemothoraces that occur due to pulmonary contusion, those due to lung laceration may be large and long lasting. However, the lungs do not usually bleed very much because the blood vessels involved are small and the pressure within them is low. Therefore, pneumothorax is usually more of a problem than hemothorax. A pneumothorax may form or be turned into a tension pneumothorax by mechanical ventilation, which may force air out of the tear in the lung.

The laceration may also close up by itself, which can cause it to trap blood and potentially form a cyst or hematoma. Because the lung is elastic, the tear forms a round cyst called a traumatic air cyst that may be filled with air, or blood and air, and that usually shrinks over a period of weeks or months. Lacerations that are filled with air are called pneumatoceles, and those that are filled with blood are called pulmonary hematomas. In some cases, both pneumatoceles and hematomas exist in the same injured lung. A pneumatocele can become enlarged, for example when the patient is mechanically ventilated or has acute respiratory distress syndrome, in which case it may not go away for months. Pulmonary hematomas take longer to heal than simple pneumatoceles and commonly leave the lungs scarred.

Over time, the walls of lung lacerations tend to grow thicker due to edema and bleeding at the edges.

== Diagnosis ==
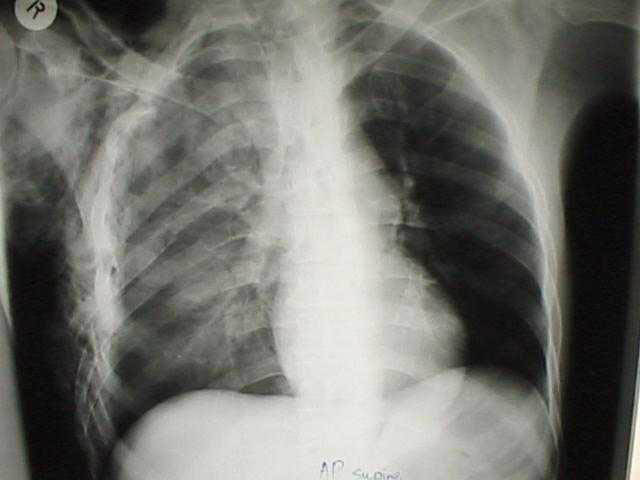
A chest X-ray of a right sided pulmonary contusion associated with flail chest and subcutaneous emphysema. Contusion may mask pulmonary laceration on chest X-ray.

Pulmonary laceration may not be visible using chest X-ray because an associated pulmonary contusion or hemorrhage may mask it. As the lung contusion clears (usually within two to four days), lacerations begin to become visible on chest X-ray. CT scanning is more sensitive and better at detecting pulmonary laceration than X-rays are, and often reveals multiple lacerations in cases where chest X-ray showed only a contusion. Before CT scanning was widely available, pulmonary laceration was considered unusual because it was not common to find with X-ray alone. On a CT scan, pulmonary lacerations show up in a contused area of the lung, typically appearing as cavities filled with air or fluid that usually have a round or ovoid shape due to the lung's elasticity.

Hematomas appear on chest radiographs as smooth masses that are round or ovoid in shape. Like lacerations, hematomas may initially be hidden on X-ray by lung contusions, but they become more apparent as the contusion begins to heal. Pneumatoceles have a similar shape to that of hematomas but have thin, smooth walls. Lacerations may be filled completely with blood, completely with air, or partially with both. Lacerations filled with both blood and air display a distinctive air-fluid level. A single laceration may occur by itself, or many may be present, creating an appearance like Swiss cheese in the radiography of the lung.

Pulmonary laceration is usually accompanied by hemoptysis (coughing up blood or of blood-stained sputum).

Thoracoscopy may be used in both diagnosis and treatment of pulmonary laceration.

A healing laceration may resemble a lung nodule on radiographs, but unlike pulmonary nodules, lacerations decrease in size over time on radiographs.

=== Classification ===
In 1988, a group led by R.B. Wagner divided pulmonary lacerations into four types based on the manner in which the person was injured and indications found on a CT scan. In type 1 lacerations, which occur in the mid lung area, the air-filled lung bursts as a result of sudden compression of the chest. Also called compression-rupture lacerations, type 1 are the most common type and usually occur in a central location of the lung. They tend to be large, ranging in size from 2–8 cm. The shearing stress in type 2 results when the lower chest is suddenly compressed and the lower lung is suddenly moved across the vertebral bodies. Type 2, also called compression-shear, tends to occur near the spine and have an elongated shape. Type 2 lacerations usually occur in younger people with more flexible chests. Type 3, which are caused by punctures from fractured ribs, occur in the area near the chest wall underlying the broken rib. Also called rib penetration lacerations, type 3 lacerations tend to be small and accompanied by pneumothorax. Commonly, more than one type 3 laceration will occur. Type 4, also called adhesion tears, occur in cases where a pleuropulmonary adhesion had formed prior to the injury, in which the chest wall is suddenly fractured or pushed inwards. They occur in the subpleural area and result from shearing forces at sites of transpleural adhesion.

== Treatment ==
As with other chest injuries such as pulmonary contusion, hemothorax, and pneumothorax, pulmonary laceration can often be treated with just supplemental oxygen, ventilation, and drainage of fluids from the chest cavity. A thoracostomy tube can be used to remove blood and air from the chest cavity. About 5% of cases require surgery, called thoracotomy. Thoracotomy is especially likely to be needed if a lung fails to re-expand; if pneumothorax, bleeding, or coughing up blood persist; or in order to remove clotted blood from a hemothorax. Surgical treatment includes suturing, stapling, oversewing, and wedging out of the laceration. Occasionally, surgeons must perform a lobectomy, in which a lobe of the lung is removed, or a pneumonectomy, in which an entire lung is removed.

== Prognosis ==
Full recovery is common with proper treatment. Pulmonary laceration usually heals quickly after a chest tube is inserted and is usually not associated with major long-term problems. Pulmonary lacerations usually heal within three to five weeks, and lacerations filled with air will commonly heal within one to three weeks but on occasion take longer. However, the injury often takes weeks or months to heal, and the lung may be scarred. Small pulmonary lacerations frequently heal by themselves if material is removed from the pleural space, but surgery may be required for larger lacerations that do not heal properly or that bleed.

== See also ==
- Pulmonary toilet
