= Sternal fracture =

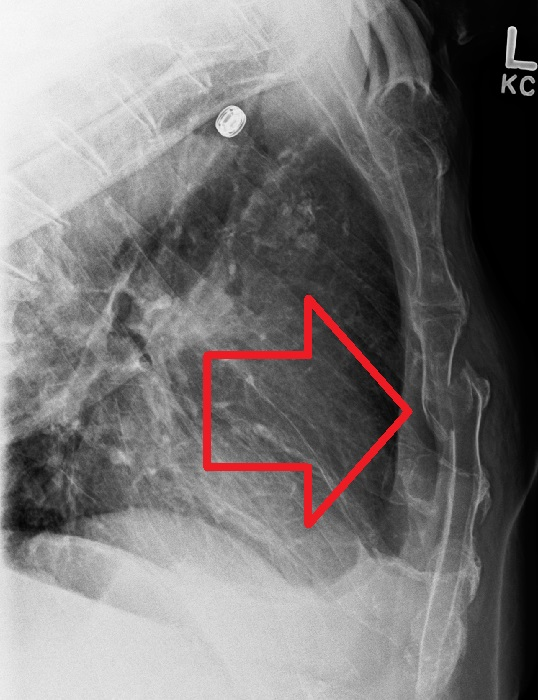
- A displaced sternal fracture as seen on plain X-ray
- Specialty: Orthopedic
- Diagnostic method: Chest radiograph

A sternal fracture is a fracture of the sternum (the breastbone), located in the center of the chest. The injury, which occurs in 5–8% of people who experience significant blunt chest trauma, may occur in vehicle accidents, when the still-moving chest strikes a steering wheel or dashboard or is injured by a seatbelt. Cardiopulmonary resuscitation (CPR) has also been known to cause thoracic injury, including sternum and rib fractures. Sternal fractures may also occur as a pathological fracture, in people who have weakened bone in their sternum, due to another disease process. Sternal fracture can interfere with breathing by making it more painful; however, its primary significance is that it can indicate the presence of serious associated internal injuries, especially to the heart and lungs.

== Signs and symptoms ==
Signs and symptoms include crepitus (a crunching sound made when broken bone ends rub together), pain, tenderness, bruising, and swelling over the fracture site. The fracture may visibly move when the person breathes, and it may be bent or deformed, potentially forming a "step" at the junction of the broken bone ends that is detectable by palpation. Associated injuries such as those to the heart may cause symptoms such as abnormalities seen on electrocardiograms.

The upper and middle parts of the sternum are those most likely to fracture, but most sternal fractures occur below the sternal angle.

=== Associated injuries ===
Because of the high frequency of associated injuries, clinicians are taught to suspect that a patient has multiple severe injuries if a sternal fracture is present. Sternal fracture is commonly associated with injuries to the heart and lungs; if a person is injured with enough force to fracture the sternum, injuries such as myocardial and pulmonary contusions are likely. Other associated injuries that may occur include damage to blood vessels in the chest, myocardial rupture, head and abdominal injuries, flail chest, and vertebral fracture. Sternal fractures may also accompany rib fractures and are high-energy enough injuries to cause bronchial tears (ruptures of the bronchioles). They may hinder breathing. Due to the associated injuries, the mortality rate for people with sternal fracture is high, at an estimated 25–45%. However, when sternal fractures occur in isolation, their outcome is very good.

There is controversy over the question of whether the presence of sternal fracture is an indication of cardiac injuries.

== Causes ==
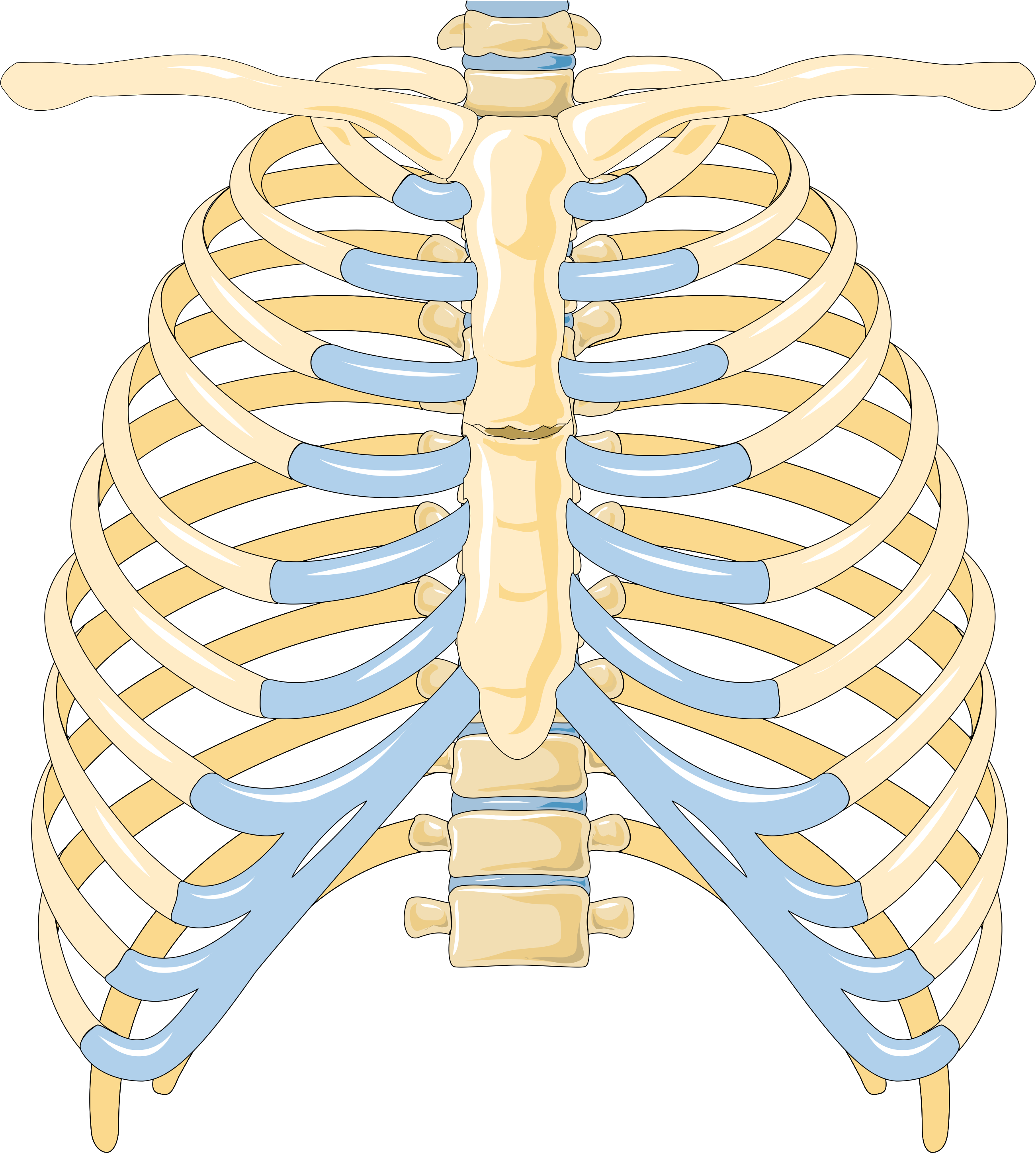
Illustration showing sternal fracture between ribs 3 and 4

Vehicle collisions are the usual cause of sternal fracture; the injury is estimated to occur in about 3% of auto accidents. The chest of a driver who is not wearing a seat belt may strike the steering wheel, and the shoulder component of a seatbelt may injure the chest if it is worn without the lap component. It was common enough for the sternum to be injured by the seatbelt that it was included in the 'safety belt syndrome', a pattern of injuries caused by seat belts in vehicle accidents.

The injury can also occur when the chest suddenly flexes, in the absence of an impact. In the case of an injury sustained during CPR, the most common injuries sustained are rib fractures, with literature suggesting an incidence between 13% and 97%, and sternal fractures, with an incidence between 1% and 43%. Additionally, injury to the sternum may be made more likely if there are other disease processes in place that have weakened the bone - in this case, the fracture that occurs is termed a pathologic fracture.

== Diagnosis ==
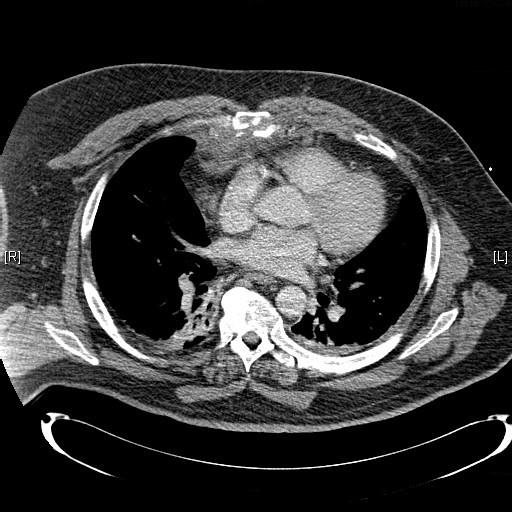
CT scan showing a comminuted sternal fracture.

X-rays of the chest are taken in people with chest trauma and symptoms of sternal fractures, and these may be followed by CT scanning. Since X-rays taken from the front may miss the injury, they are taken from the side as well.

== Treatment ==
Management involves treating associated injuries; people with sternal fractures but no other injuries do not need to be hospitalized. However, because it is common for cardiac injuries to accompany sternal fracture, heart function is monitored with electrocardiogram. Fractures that are very painful or extremely out of place can be operated on to fix the bone fragments into place, but in most cases treatment consists mainly of reducing pain and limiting movement. The fracture may interfere with breathing, requiring tracheal intubation and mechanical ventilation.

People who experience a pathologic fracture will be investigated for the cause of the underlying disease, if it is unknown. Treatment of any underlying disease, such as chemotherapy if indicated for bone cancer, may help to improve the pain of a sternal fracture.

== History ==
In 1864, E. Guilt published a handbook recording sternal fractures as a rare injury found in severe trauma. The injury became more common with the introduction and wide use of automobiles and the subsequent rise in traffic accidents. A rise in sternal fractures has also been seen with an increase in the frequency of laws requiring that seat belts be worn.

== See also ==
- Pulmonary hygiene
