= Chest injury =

- Other names: Chest trauma, Commotio thoracis
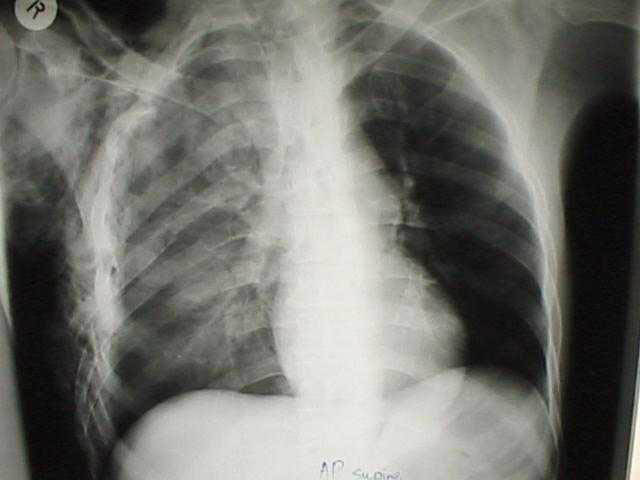
- A chest X-ray of a right sided pulmonary contusion associated with flail chest and subcutaneous emphysema
- Specialty: Emergency medicine

A chest injury, also known as chest trauma, is any form of physical injury to the chest including the ribs, heart and lungs. Chest injuries account for 25% of all deaths from traumatic injury. Typically chest injuries are caused by blunt mechanisms such as direct, indirect, compression, contusion, deceleration, or blasts caused by motor vehicle collisions or penetrating mechanisms such as stabbings.

== Classification ==
Chest injuries can be classified as blunt or penetrating. Blunt and penetrating injuries have different pathophysiologies and clinical courses.

Specific types of injuries include:

- Injuries to the chest wall
  - Chest wall contusions or hematomas
  - Rib fractures
  - Flail chest
  - Sternal fractures
  - Fractures of the shoulder girdle
- Pulmonary injury (injury to the lung) and injuries involving the pleural space
  - Pulmonary contusion
  - Pulmonary laceration
  - Pneumothorax
  - Hemothorax
  - Hemopneumothorax
- Injury to the airways
  - Tracheobronchial tear
- Cardiac injury
  - Pericardial tamponade
  - Myocardial contusion
  - Traumatic arrest
  - Hemopericardium
- Blood vessel injuries
  - Traumatic aortic rupture
  - Thoracic aorta injury
  - Aortic dissection
- And injuries to other structures within the torso
  - Esophageal injury (Boerhaave syndrome)
  - Diaphragm injury

== Diagnosis ==
Most blunt injuries are managed with relatively simple interventions like tracheal intubation and mechanical ventilation and chest tube insertion. Diagnosis of blunt injuries may be more difficult and require additional investigations such as CT scanning. Penetrating injuries often require surgery, and complex investigations are usually not needed to come to a diagnosis. Patients with penetrating trauma may deteriorate rapidly, but may also recover much faster than patients with blunt injury.

== Outcomes ==
Chest trauma outcomes depend on the severity of the chest injury as well as associated injuries (such as head or spinal trauma) and the patient’s general health condition.

Early management in specialist centres offers better survival. Management is a mixture of medical (eg pain relief, respiratory support, chest drainage and antibiotics), non-medical (physiotherapy and rehabilitation) and surgical (fixation of rib fractures if appropriate and operative treatment of cardiac, lung, airway, diaphragm and oesophageal injuries).

Those who survive chest trauma and are discharged from hospital have a long-term survival comparable to the general population.

== See also ==
- Transmediastinal gunshot wound
- Commotio thoracis
