= Pulmonary contusion =

Internal bruise of the lungs

- Other names: Lung contusion
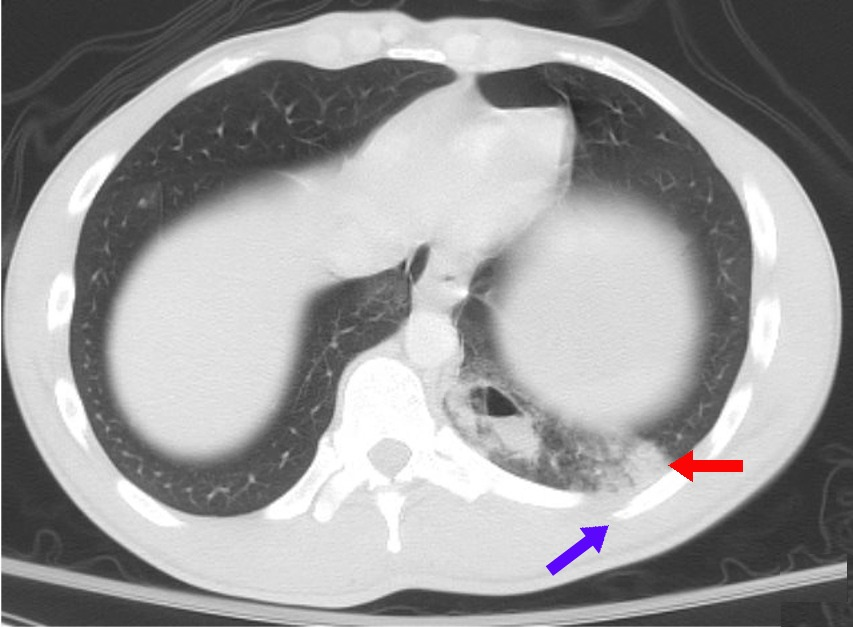
- A CT scan showing a pulmonary contusion (red arrow) accompanied by a rib fracture (purple arrow)
- Specialty: Emergency medicine

A pulmonary contusion, also known as a lung contusion, is a bruise of the lung, caused by chest trauma. As a result of damage to capillaries, blood and other fluids accumulate in the lung tissue. The excess fluid interferes with gas exchange, potentially leading to inadequate oxygen levels (hypoxia). Unlike a pulmonary laceration, another type of lung injury, a pulmonary contusion does not involve a cut or tear of the lung tissue.

A pulmonary contusion is usually caused directly by blunt trauma but can also result from explosion injuries or a shock wave associated with penetrating trauma. With the use of explosives during World Wars I and II, pulmonary contusion resulting from blasts gained recognition. In the 1960s its occurrence in civilians began to receive wider recognition, in which cases it is usually caused by traffic accidents. The use of seat belts and airbags reduces the risk to vehicle occupants.

Diagnosis is made by studying the cause of the injury, physical examination and chest radiography. Typical signs and symptoms include direct effects of the physical trauma, such as chest pain and coughing up blood, as well as signs that the body is not receiving enough oxygen, such as cyanosis. The contusion frequently heals on its own with supportive care. Often nothing more than supplemental oxygen and close monitoring is needed; however, intensive care may be required. For example, if breathing is severely compromised, mechanical ventilation may be necessary. Fluid replacement may be required to ensure adequate blood volume, but fluids are given carefully since fluid overload can worsen pulmonary edema, which may be lethal.

The severity ranges from mild to severe: small contusions may have little or no impact on health, yet pulmonary contusion is the most common type of potentially lethal chest trauma. It occurs in 30–75% of severe chest injuries. The risk of death following a pulmonary contusion is between 14 and 40%. Pulmonary contusion is usually accompanied by other injuries. Although associated injuries are often the cause of death, pulmonary contusion is thought to cause death directly in a quarter to half of cases. Children are at especially high risk for the injury because the relative flexibility of their bones prevents the chest wall from absorbing force from an impact, causing it to be transmitted instead to the lung. Pulmonary contusion is associated with complications including pneumonia and acute respiratory distress syndrome, and it can cause long-term respiratory disability.

== Classification ==
The alveoli

Pulmonary contusion and laceration are injuries to the lung tissue. Pulmonary laceration, in which lung tissue is torn or cut, differs from pulmonary contusion in that the former involves disruption of the macroscopic architecture of the lung, while the latter does not. When lacerations fill with blood, the result is pulmonary hematoma, a collection of blood within the lung tissue. Contusion involves hemorrhage in the alveoli (tiny air-filled sacs responsible for absorbing oxygen), but a hematoma is a discrete clot of blood not interspersed with lung tissue. A collapsed lung can result when the pleural cavity (the space outside the lung) accumulates blood (hemothorax) or air (pneumothorax) or both (hemopneumothorax). These conditions do not inherently involve damage to the lung tissue itself, but they may be associated with it. Injuries to the chest wall are also distinct from but may be associated with lung injuries. Chest wall injuries include rib fractures and flail chest, in which multiple ribs are broken so that a segment of the ribcage is detached from the rest of the chest wall and moves independently.

== Signs and symptoms ==
Presentation may be subtle; people with mild contusion may have no symptoms at all. However, pulmonary contusion is frequently associated with signs (objective indications) and symptoms (subjective states), including those indicative of the lung injury itself and of accompanying injuries. Because gas exchange is impaired, signs of low blood oxygen saturation, such as low concentrations of oxygen in arterial blood gas and cyanosis (bluish color of the skin and mucous membranes) are commonly associated. Dyspnea (painful breathing or difficulty breathing) is commonly seen, and tolerance for exercise may be lowered. Rapid breathing and a rapid heart rate are other signs. With more severe contusions, breath sounds heard through a stethoscope may be decreased, or rales (an abnormal crackling sound in the chest accompanying breathing) may be present. People with severe contusions may have bronchorrhea (the production of watery sputum). Wheezing and coughing are other signs. Coughing up blood or bloody sputum is present in up to half of cases. Cardiac output (the volume of blood pumped by the heart) may be reduced, and hypotension (low blood pressure) is frequently present. The area of the chest wall near the contusion may be tender or painful due to associated chest wall injury.

Signs and symptoms take time to develop, and as many as half of cases are asymptomatic at the initial presentation. The more severe the injury, the more quickly symptoms become apparent. In severe cases, symptoms may occur as quickly as three or four hours after the trauma. Hypoxemia (low oxygen concentration in the arterial blood) typically becomes progressively worse over 24–48 hours after injury. In general, pulmonary contusion tends to worsen slowly over a few days, but it may also cause rapid deterioration or death if untreated.

== Causes ==
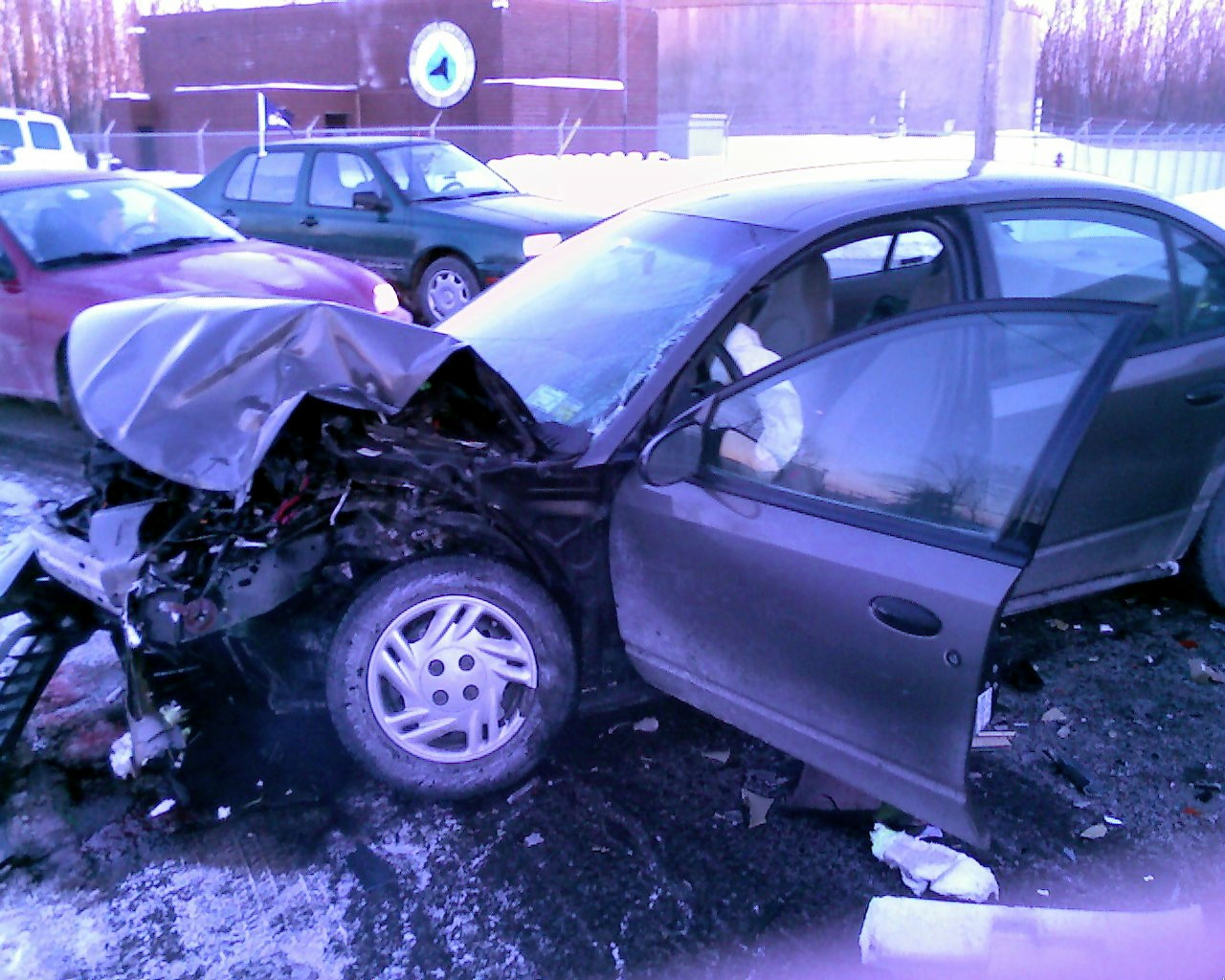
Motor vehicle collisions are the most common cause of pulmonary contusion.

Pulmonary contusion is the most common injury found in blunt chest trauma, occurring in 25–35% of cases.It is usually caused by the rapid deceleration that results when the moving chest strikes a fixed object.About 70% of cases result from motor vehicle collisions, most often when the chest strikes the inside of the car. Falls, assaults, and sports injuries are other causes.Pulmonary contusion can also be caused by explosions; the organs most vulnerable to blast injuries are those that contain gas, such as the lungs. Blast lung is severe pulmonary contusion, bleeding, or edema with damage to alveoli and blood vessels, or a combination of these. This is the primary cause of death among people who initially survive an explosion. Unlike other mechanisms of injury in which pulmonary contusion is often found alongside other injuries, explosions can cause pulmonary contusion without damage to the chest wall.

In addition to blunt trauma, penetrating trauma can cause pulmonary contusion.

Contusion resulting from penetration by a rapidly moving projectile usually surrounds the path along which the projectile traveled through the tissue. The pressure wave forces tissue out of the way, creating a temporary cavity; the tissue readily moves back into place, but it is damaged. Pulmonary contusions that accompany gun and knife wounds are not usually severe enough to have a major effect on outcome; penetrating trauma causes less widespread lung damage than does blunt trauma. An exception is shotgun wounds, which can seriously damage large areas of lung tissue through a blast injury mechanism.

== Mechanism ==
The physical processes behind pulmonary contusion are poorly understood. However, it is known that lung tissue can be crushed when the chest wall bends inward on impact. Three other possible mechanisms have been suggested: the inertial effect, the spalling effect, and the implosion effect.

- In the inertial effect, the lighter alveolar tissue is sheared from the heavier hilar structures, an effect similar to diffuse axonal injury in head injury. It results from the fact that different tissues have different densities, and therefore different rates of acceleration or deceleration.
- In the spalling effect, lung tissue bursts or is sheared where a shock wave meets the lung tissue, at interfaces between gas and liquid. The alveolar walls form such a gas-liquid interface with the air in the alveoli. The spalling effect occurs in areas with large differences in density; particles of the denser tissue are spalled (thrown) into the less dense particles.
- The implosion effect occurs when a pressure wave passes through a tissue containing bubbles of gas: the bubbles first implode, then rebound and expand beyond their original volume. The air bubbles cause many tiny explosions, resulting in tissue damage; the overexpansion of gas bubbles stretches and tears alveoli. This effect is thought to occur microscopically when the pressure in the airways increases sharply.

Contusion usually occurs on the lung directly under the site of impact, but, as with traumatic brain injury, a contrecoup contusion may occur at the site opposite the impact as well. A blow to the front of the chest may cause contusion on the back of the lungs because a shock wave travels through the chest and hits the curved back of the chest wall; this reflects the energy onto the back of the lungs, concentrating it. (A similar mechanism may occur at the front of the lungs when the back is struck.)

The amount of energy transferred to the lung is determined in a large part by the compliance (flexibility) of the chest wall. Children's chests are more flexible because their ribs are more elastic and there is less ossification of their intercostal cartilage. Therefore, their chest walls bend, absorbing less of the force and transmitting more of it to the underlying organs. An adult's more bony chest wall absorbs more of the force itself rather than transmitting it. Thus children commonly get pulmonary contusions without fractures overlying them, while elderly people are more likely to develop fractures than contusions. One study found that pulmonary contusions were accompanied by fractures 62% of the time in children and 80% of the time in adults.

== Pathophysiology ==
Normally, oxygen and carbon dioxide diffuse across the capillary and alveolar membranes and the interstitial space (top). Fluid impairs this diffusion, resulting in less oxygenated blood (bottom).

Pulmonary contusion results in bleeding and fluid leakage into lung tissue, which can become stiffened and lose its normal elasticity. The water content of the lung increases over the first 72 hours after injury, potentially leading to frank pulmonary edema in more serious cases. As a result of these and other pathological processes, pulmonary contusion progresses over time and can cause hypoxia (insufficient oxygen).

=== Bleeding and edema ===
In contusions, torn capillaries leak fluid into the tissues around them. The membrane between alveoli and capillaries is torn; damage to this capillary–alveolar membrane and small blood vessels causes blood and fluids to leak into the alveoli and the interstitial space (the space surrounding cells) of the lung. With more severe trauma, there is a greater amount of edema, bleeding, and tearing of the alveoli. Pulmonary contusion is characterized by microhemorrhages (tiny bleeds) that occur when the alveoli are traumatically separated from airway structures and blood vessels. Blood initially collects in the interstitial space, and then edema occurs by an hour or two after injury. An area of bleeding in the contused lung is commonly surrounded by an area of edema. In normal gas exchange, carbon dioxide diffuses across the endothelium of the capillaries, the interstitial space, and across the alveolar epithelium; oxygen diffuses in the other direction. Fluid accumulation interferes with gas exchange, and can cause the alveoli to fill with proteins and collapse due to edema and bleeding. The larger the area of the injury, the more severe respiratory compromise will be.

=== Consolidation and collapse ===
Pulmonary contusion can cause parts of the lung to consolidate, alveoli to collapse, and atelectasis (partial or total lung collapse) to occur. Consolidation occurs when the parts of the lung that are normally filled with air fill with material from the pathological condition, such as blood. Over a period of hours after the injury, the alveoli in the injured area thicken and may become consolidated. A decrease in the amount of surfactant produced also contributes to the collapse and consolidation of alveoli; inactivation of surfactant increases their surface tension. Reduced production of surfactant can also occur in surrounding tissue that was not originally injured.

Inflammation of the lungs, which can result when components of blood enter the tissue due to contusion, can also cause parts of the lung to collapse. Macrophages, neutrophils, and other inflammatory cells and blood components can enter the lung tissue and release factors that lead to inflammation, increasing the likelihood of respiratory failure. In response to inflammation, excess mucus is produced, potentially plugging parts of the lung and leading to their collapse. Even when only one side of the chest is injured, inflammation may also affect the other lung. Uninjured lung tissue may develop edema, thickening of the septa of the alveoli, and other changes. If this inflammation is severe enough, it can lead to dysfunction of the lungs like that seen in acute respiratory distress syndrome.

=== Ventilation/perfusion mismatch ===
Normally, the ratio of ventilation to perfusion is about one-to-one; the volume of air entering the alveoli (ventilation) is about equal to that of blood in the capillaries around them (perfusion). This ratio is reduced in pulmonary contusion; fluid-filled alveoli cannot fill with air, oxygen does not fully saturate the hemoglobin, and the blood leaves the lung without being fully oxygenated. Insufficient inflation of the lungs, which can result from inadequate mechanical ventilation or an associated injury such as flail chest, can also contribute to the ventilation/perfusion mismatch. As the mismatch between ventilation and perfusion grows, blood oxygen saturation is reduced. Pulmonary hypoxic vasoconstriction, in which blood vessels near the hypoxic alveoli constrict (narrow their diameter) in response to the lowered oxygen levels, can occur in pulmonary contusion. The vascular resistance increases in the contused part of the lung, leading to a decrease in the amount of blood that flows into it, directing blood to better-ventilated areas. Although reducing blood flow to the unventilated alveoli is a way to compensate for the fact that blood passing unventilated alveoli is not oxygenated, the oxygenation of the blood remains lower than normal. If it is severe enough, the hypoxemia resulting from fluid in the alveoli cannot be corrected just by giving supplemental oxygen; this problem is the cause of a large portion of the fatalities that result from trauma.

== Diagnosis ==
To diagnose pulmonary contusion, health professionals use clues from a physical examination, information about the event that caused the injury, and radiography. Laboratory findings may also be used; for example, arterial blood gasses may show insufficient oxygen and excessive carbon dioxide even in someone receiving supplemental oxygen. However, blood gas levels may show no abnormality early in the course of pulmonary contusion.

=== X-ray ===
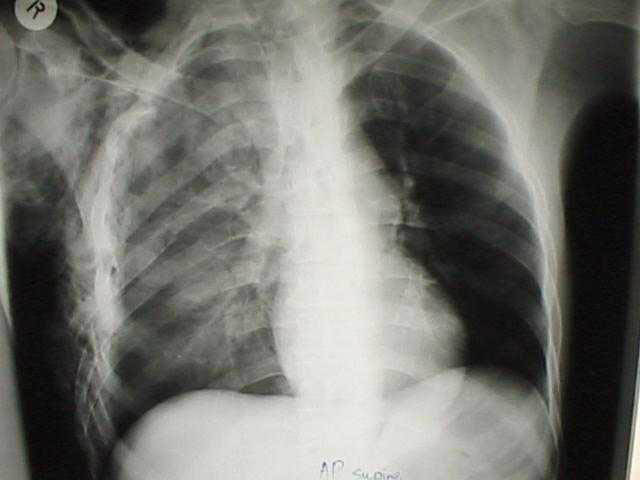
A chest X-ray showing right sided (seen on the left of the picture) pulmonary contusion associated with rib fractures and subcutaneous emphysema

Chest X-ray is the most common method used for diagnosis, and may be used to confirm a diagnosis already made using clinical signs. Consolidated areas appear white on an X-ray film. Contusion is not typically restricted by the anatomical boundaries of the lobes or segments of the lung. The X-ray appearance of pulmonary contusion is similar to that of aspiration, and the presence of hemothorax or pneumothorax may obscure the contusion on a radiograph. Signs of contusion that progress after 48 hours post-injury are likely to be actually due to aspiration, pneumonia, or ARDS.

Although chest radiography is an important part of the diagnosis, it is often not sensitive enough to detect the condition early after the injury. In a third of cases, pulmonary contusion is not visible on the first chest radiograph performed. It takes an average of six hours for the characteristic white regions to show up on a chest X-ray, and the contusion may not become apparent for 48 hours. When a pulmonary contusion is apparent in an X-ray, it suggests that the trauma to the chest was severe and that a CT scan might reveal other injuries that were missed with X-ray.

=== Computed tomography ===
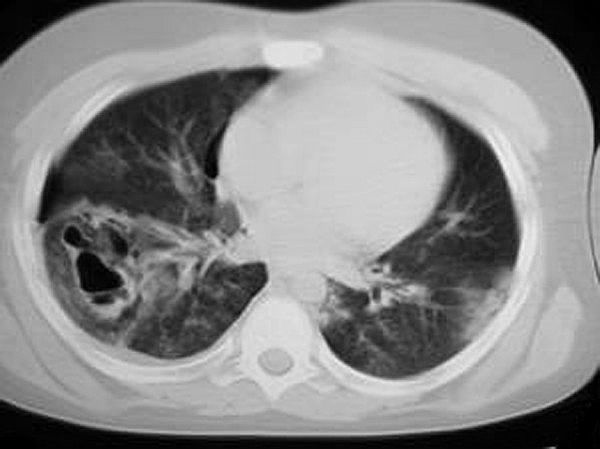
A chest CT scan revealing pulmonary contusions, pneumothorax, and pseudocysts

Computed tomography (CT scanning) is a more sensitive test for pulmonary contusion, and it can identify abdominal, chest, or other injuries that accompany the contusion. In one study, chest X-ray detected pulmonary contusions in 16.3% of people with serious blunt trauma, while CT detected them in 31.2% of the same people. Unlike X-ray, CT scanning can detect the contusion almost immediately after the injury. However, in both X-ray and CT a contusion may become more visible over the first 24–48 hours after trauma as bleeding and edema into lung tissues progress. CT scanning also helps determine the size of a contusion, which is useful in determining whether a patient needs mechanical ventilation; a larger volume of contused lung on CT scan is associated with an increased likelihood that ventilation will be needed. CT scans also help differentiate between contusion and pulmonary hematoma, which may be difficult to tell apart otherwise. However, pulmonary contusions that are visible on CT but not chest X-ray are usually not severe enough to affect outcome or treatment.

=== Ultrasound ===
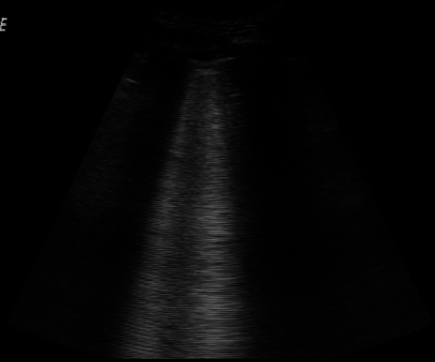
An ultrasound image showing early pulmonary contusion, at this moment not visible on radiography. Lung swelling is seen as vertical white lines, the "B-lines".

Pulmonary ultrasound, performed at the bedside or on the accident scene, is being explored as a diagnosis for pulmonary contusion. Its use is still not widespread, being limited to facilities which are comfortable with its use for other applications, like pneumothorax, airway management, and hemothorax. Accuracy has been found to be comparable to CT scanning.

== Prevention ==
Prevention of pulmonary contusion is similar to that of other chest trauma. Airbags in combination with seat belts can protect vehicle occupants by preventing the chest from striking the interior of the vehicle during a collision, and by distributing forces involved in the crash more evenly across the body. However, in rare cases, an airbag causes pulmonary contusion in a person who is not properly positioned when it deploys. Child restraints such as carseats protect children in vehicle collisions from pulmonary contusion. Equipment exists for use in some sports to prevent chest and lung injury; for example, in softball the catcher is equipped with a chest protector. Athletes who do not wear such equipment, such as basketball players, can be trained to protect their chests from impacts. Protective garments can also prevent pulmonary contusion in explosions. Although traditional body armor made from rigid plates or other heavy materials protects from projectiles generated by a blast, it does not protect against pulmonary contusion, because it does not prevent the blast's shock wave from being transferred to the lung. Special body armor has been designed for military personnel at high risk for blast injuries; these garments can prevent a shock wave from being propagated across the chest wall to the lung, and thus protect wearers from blast lung injuries. These garments alternate layers of materials with high and low acoustic impedance (the product of a material's density and a wave's velocity through it) in order to "decouple" the blast wave, preventing its propagation into the tissues.

== Treatment ==
No treatment is known to speed the healing of a pulmonary contusion; the main care is supportive. Attempts are made to discover injuries accompanying the contusion, to prevent additional injury, and to provide supportive care while waiting for the contusion to heal. Monitoring, including keeping track of fluid balance, respiratory function, and oxygen saturation using pulse oximetry is also required as the patient's condition may progressively worsen. Monitoring for complications such as pneumonia and acute respiratory distress syndrome is of critical importance. Treatment aims to prevent respiratory failure and to ensure adequate blood oxygenation. Supplemental oxygen can be given and it may be warmed and humidified. When the contusion does not respond to other treatments, extracorporeal membranous oxygenation may be used, pumping blood from the body into a machine that oxygenates it and removes carbon dioxide prior to pumping it back in.

=== Ventilation ===
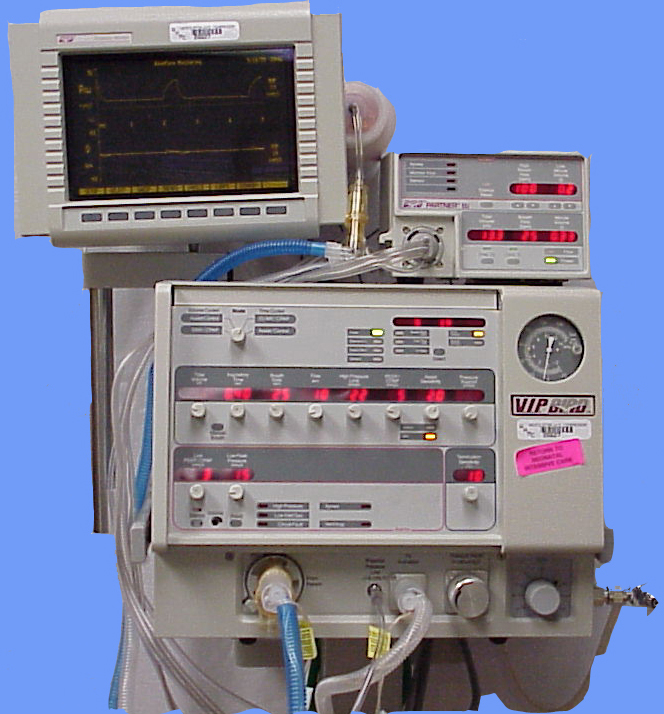
Mechanical ventilation may be required if pulmonary contusion causes inadequate oxygenation.

Positive pressure ventilation, in which air is forced into the lungs, is needed when oxygenation is significantly impaired. Noninvasive positive pressure ventilation including continuous positive airway pressure (CPAP) and bi-level positive airway pressure (BiPAP), may be used to improve oxygenation and treat atelectasis: air is blown into the airways at a prescribed pressure via a face mask. Noninvasive ventilation has advantages over invasive methods because it does not carry the risk of infection that intubation does, and it allows normal coughing, swallowing, and speech. However, the technique may cause complications; it may force air into the stomach or cause aspiration of stomach contents, especially when level of consciousness is decreased.

People with signs of inadequate respiration or oxygenation may need to be intubated and mechanically ventilated. Mechanical ventilation aims to reduce pulmonary edema and increase oxygenation. Ventilation can reopen collapsed alveoli, but it is harmful for them to be repeatedly opened, and positive pressure ventilation can also damage the lung by overinflating it. Intubation is normally reserved for when respiratory problems occur, but most significant contusions do require intubation, and it may be done early in anticipation of this need. People with pulmonary contusion who are especially likely to need ventilation include those with prior severe lung disease or kidney problems; the elderly; those with a lowered level of consciousness; those with low blood oxygen or high carbon dioxide levels; and those who will undergo operations with anesthesia. Larger contusions have been correlated with a need for ventilation for longer periods of time.

Pulmonary contusion or its complications such as acute respiratory distress syndrome may cause lungs to lose compliance (stiffen), so higher pressures may be needed to give normal amounts of air and oxygenate the blood adequately. Positive end-expiratory pressure (PEEP), which delivers air at a given pressure at the end of the expiratory cycle, can reduce edema and keep alveoli from collapsing. PEEP is considered necessary with mechanical ventilation; however, if the pressure is too great it can expand the size of the contusion and injure the lung. When the compliance of the injured lung differs significantly from that of the uninjured one, the lungs can be ventilated independently with two ventilators in order to deliver air at different pressures; this helps avoid injury from overinflation while providing adequate ventilation.

=== Fluid therapy ===
The administration of fluid therapy in individuals with pulmonary contusion is controversial. Excessive fluid in the circulatory system (hypervolemia) can worsen hypoxia because it can cause fluid leakage from injured capillaries (pulmonary edema), which are more permeable than normal. However, low blood volume (hypovolemia) resulting from insufficient fluid has an even worse impact, potentially causing hypovolemic shock; for people who have lost large amounts of blood, fluid resuscitation is necessary. A lot of the evidence supporting the idea that fluids should be withheld from people with pulmonary contusion came from animal studies, not clinical trials with humans; human studies have had conflicting findings on whether fluid resuscitation worsens the condition. Current recommendations suggest giving enough fluid to ensure sufficient blood flow but not giving any more fluid than necessary. For people who do require large amounts of intravenous fluid, a catheter may be placed in the pulmonary artery to measure the pressure within it. Measuring pulmonary artery pressure allows the clinician to give enough fluids to prevent shock without exacerbating edema. Diuretics, drugs that increase urine output to reduce excessive fluid in the system, can be used when fluid overload does occur, as long as there is not a significant risk of shock. Furosemide, a diuretic used in the treatment of pulmonary contusion, also relaxes the smooth muscle in the veins of the lungs, thereby decreasing pulmonary venous resistance and reducing the pressure in the pulmonary capillaries.

=== Supportive care ===
Retaining secretions in the airways can worsen hypoxia and lead to infections. Thus, an important part of treatment is pulmonary toilet, the use of suction, deep breathing, coughing, and other methods to remove material such as mucus and blood from the airways. Chest physical therapy makes use of techniques such as breathing exercises, stimulation of coughing, suctioning, percussion, movement, vibration, and drainage to rid the lungs of secretions, increase oxygenation, and expand collapsed parts of the lungs. People with pulmonary contusion, especially those who do not respond well to other treatments, may be positioned with the uninjured lung lower than the injured one to improve oxygenation. Inadequate pulmonary toilet can result in pneumonia. People who do develop infections are given antibiotics. No studies have yet shown a benefit of using antibiotics as a preventative measure before infection occurs, although some doctors do recommend prophylactic antibiotic use even without scientific evidence of its benefit. However, this can cause the development of antibiotic resistant strains of bacteria, so giving antibiotics without a clear need is normally discouraged. For people who are at especially high risk of developing infections, the sputum can be cultured to test for the presence of infection-causing bacteria; when they are present, antibiotics are used.

Pain control is another means to facilitate the elimination of secretions. A chest wall injury can make coughing painful, increasing the likelihood that secretions will accumulate in the airways. Chest injuries also contribute to hypoventilation (inadequate breathing) because the chest wall movement involved in breathing adequately is painful. Insufficient expansion of the chest may lead to atelectasis, further reducing oxygenation of the blood. Analgesics (pain medications) can be given to reduce pain. Injection of anesthetics into nerves in the chest wall, called nerve blockade, is another approach to pain management; this does not depress respiration the way some pain medications can.

== Prognosis ==
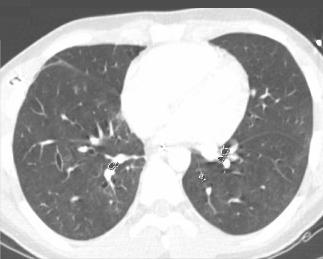
This CT scan, taken 22 days after pulmonary contusion with major chest trauma, shows that the contusion has completely resolved.

Pulmonary contusion usually resolves itself without causing permanent complications; however it may also have long-term ill effects on respiratory function. Most contusions resolve in five to seven days after the injury. Signs detectable by radiography are usually gone within 10 days after the injury—when they are not, other conditions, such as pneumonia, are the likely cause. Chronic lung disease correlates with the size of the contusion and can interfere with an individual's ability to return to work. Fibrosis of the lungs can occur, resulting in dyspnea (shortness of breath), low blood oxygenation, and reduced functional residual capacity for as long as six years after the injury. As late as four years post-injury, decreased functional residual capacity has been found in most pulmonary contusion patients studied. During the six months after pulmonary contusion, up to 90% of people have difficulty breathing. In some cases, dyspnea persists for an indefinite period. Contusion can also permanently reduce the compliance of the lungs.

=== Complications ===
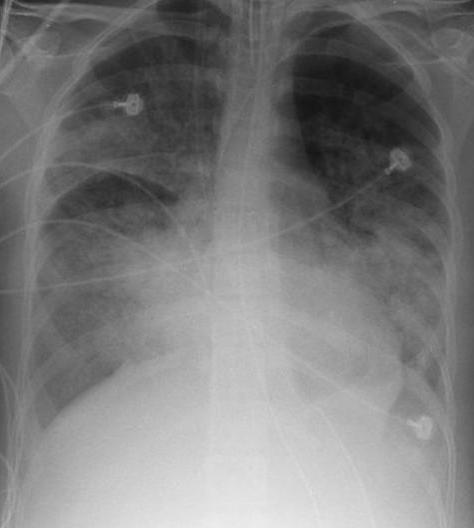
A chest X-ray showing acute respiratory distress syndrome

Pulmonary contusion can result in respiratory failure—about half of such cases occur within a few hours of the initial trauma. Other severe complications, including infections and acute respiratory distress syndrome (ARDS) occur in up to half of cases. Elderly people and those who have heart, lung, or kidney disease prior to the injury are more likely to stay longer in hospital and have complications from the injury. Complications occur in 55% of people with heart or lung disease and 13% of those without. Of people with pulmonary contusion alone, 17% develop ARDS, while 78% of people with at least two additional injuries develop the condition. A larger contusion is associated with an increased risk. In one study, 82% of people with 20% or more of the lung volume affected developed ARDS, while only 22% of people with less than 20% did so.

Pneumonia, another potential complication, develops in as many as 20% of people with pulmonary contusion. Contused lungs are less able to remove bacteria than uninjured lungs, predisposing them to infection. Intubation and mechanical ventilation further increase the risk of developing pneumonia; the tube is passed through the nose or mouth into the airways, potentially tracking bacteria from the mouth or sinuses into them. Also, intubation prevents coughing, which would clear bacteria-laden secretions from the airways, and secretions pool near the tube's cuff and allow bacteria to grow. The sooner the endotracheal tube is removed, the lower the risk of pneumonia, but if it is removed too early and has to be put back in, the risk of pneumonia rises. People who are at risk for pulmonary aspiration (e.g. those with lowered level of consciousness due to head injuries) are especially likely to get pneumonia. As with ARDS, the chances of developing pneumonia increase with the size of the contusion. Children and adults have been found to have similar rates of complication with pneumonia and ARDS.

=== Associated injuries ===
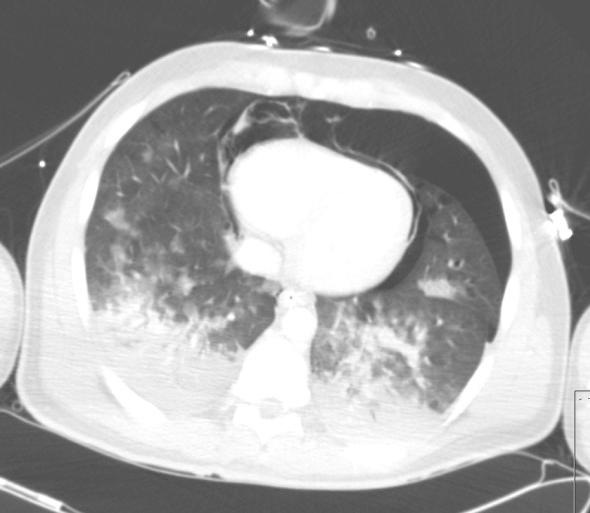
Severe pulmonary contusion with pneumothorax and hemothorax following severe chest trauma

A large amount of force is required to cause pulmonary contusion; a person injured with such force is likely to have other types of injuries as well. In fact, pulmonary contusion can be used to gauge the severity of trauma. Up to three quarters of cases are accompanied by other chest injuries, the most common of these being hemothorax and pneumothorax. Flail chest is usually associated with significant pulmonary contusion, and the contusion, rather than the chest wall injury, is often the main cause of respiratory failure in people with these injuries. Other indications of thoracic trauma may be associated, including fracture of the sternum and bruising of the chest wall. Over half of fractures of the scapula are associated with pulmonary contusion. The contusion is frequently found underlying fracture sites. When accompanied by a fracture, it is usually concentrated into a specific location—the contusion is more diffuse when there is no fracture. Pulmonary lacerations may result from the same blunt or penetrating forces that cause contusion. Lacerations can result in pulmonary hematomas; these are reported to develop in 4–11% of pulmonary contusions.

== Epidemiology ==
Pulmonary contusion is found in 30–75% of severe cases of chest injury, making it the most common serious injury to occur in association with thoracic trauma. Of people who have multiple injuries with an injury severity score of over 15, pulmonary contusion occurs in about 17%. It is difficult to determine the death rate (mortality) because pulmonary contusion rarely occurs by itself. Usually, deaths of people with pulmonary contusion result from other injuries, commonly traumatic brain injury. It is controversial whether pulmonary contusion with flail chest is a major factor in mortality on its own or whether it merely contributes to mortality in people with multiple injuries. The estimated mortality rate of pulmonary contusion ranges from 14 to 40%, depending on the severity of the contusion itself and on associated injuries. When the contusions are small, they do not normally increase the chance of death or poor outcome for people with blunt chest trauma; however, these chances increase with the size of the contusion. One study found that 35% of people with multiple significant injuries including pulmonary contusion die. In another study, 11% of people with pulmonary contusion alone died, while the number rose to 22% in those with additional injuries. Pulmonary contusion is thought to be the direct cause of death in a quarter to a half of people with multiple injuries (polytrauma) who die. An accompanying flail chest increases the morbidity and mortality to more than twice that of pulmonary contusion alone.

Pulmonary contusion is the most common cause of death among vehicle occupants involved in accidents, and it is thought to contribute significantly in about a quarter of deaths resulting from vehicle collisions. As vehicle use has increased, so has the number of auto accidents, and with it the number of chest injuries. However an increase in the number of airbags installed in modern cars may be decreasing the incidence of pulmonary contusion. Use of child restraint systems has brought the approximate incidence of pulmonary contusion in children in vehicle accidents from 22% to 10%.

Differences in the bodies of children and adults lead to different manifestations of pulmonary contusion and associated injuries; for example, children have less body mass, so the same force is more likely to lead to trauma in multiple body systems. Since their chest walls are more flexible, children are more vulnerable to pulmonary contusion than adults are, and thus suffer from the injury more commonly. Pulmonary contusion has been found in 53% of children with chest injuries requiring hospitalization. Children in forceful impacts suffer twice as many pulmonary contusions as adults with similar injury mechanisms, yet have proportionately fewer rib fractures. The rates of certain types of injury mechanisms differ between children and adults; for example, children are more often hit by cars as pedestrians. Some differences in children's physiology might be advantageous (for example they are less likely to have other medical conditions), and thus they have been predicted to have a better outcome. However, despite these differences, children with pulmonary contusion have similar mortality rates to adults.

== History ==
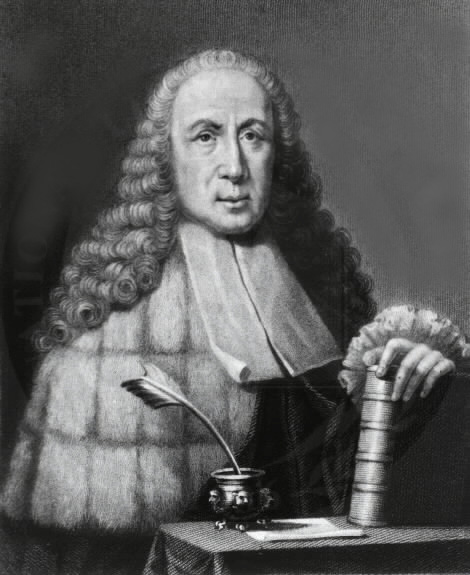
Giovanni Battista Morgagni, credited with having first described lung trauma without chest wall trauma

In 1761, the Italian anatomist Giovanni Battista Morgagni was first to describe a lung injury that was not accompanied by injury to the chest wall overlying it. Nonetheless, it was the French military surgeon Guillaume Dupuytren who is thought to have coined the term pulmonary contusion in the 19th century. It still was not until the early 20th century that pulmonary contusion and its clinical significance began to receive wide recognition. With the use of explosives during World War I came many casualties with no external signs of chest injury but with significant bleeding in the lungs. Studies of World War I injuries by D.R. Hooker showed that pulmonary contusion was an important part of the concussive injury that results from explosions.

Pulmonary contusion received further attention during World War II, when the bombings of Britain caused blast injuries and associated respiratory problems in both soldiers and civilians. Also during this time, studies with animals placed at varying distances from a blast showed that protective gear could prevent lung injuries. These findings suggested that an impact to the outside of the chest wall was responsible for the internal lesions. In 1945, studies identified a phenomenon termed "wet lung", in which the lungs accumulated fluid and were simultaneously less able to remove it. They attributed the respiratory failure often seen in blunt chest trauma in part to excessive fluid resuscitation, and the question of whether and how much to administer fluids has remained controversial ever since.

During the Vietnam War, combat again provided the opportunity for study of pulmonary contusion; research during this conflict played an important role in the development of the modern understanding of its treatment. The condition also began to be more widely recognized in a non-combat context in the 1960s, and symptoms and typical findings with imaging techniques such as X-ray were described. Before the 1960s, it was believed that the respiratory insufficiency seen in flail chest was due to "paradoxical motion" of the flail segment of the chest wall (the flail segment moves in the opposite direction as the chest wall during respiration), so treatment was aimed at managing the chest wall injury, not the pulmonary contusion. For example, positive pressure ventilation was used to stabilize the flail segment from within the chest. It was first proposed in 1965 that this respiratory insufficiency is most often due to injury of the lung rather than to the chest wall, and a group led by J.K. Trinkle confirmed this hypothesis in 1975. Hence the modern treatment prioritizes the management of pulmonary contusion. Animal studies performed in the late 1960s and 1970s shed light on the pathophysiological processes involved in pulmonary contusion. Studies in the 1990s revealed a link between pulmonary contusion and persistent respiratory difficulty for years after the injury in people in whom the injury coexisted with flail chest. In the next decade studies demonstrated that function in contused lungs improves for years after the injury.
