= Pulmonary hematoma =

Blood collection in the lungs

A pulmonary hematoma is a collection of blood within the tissue of the lung. It may result when a pulmonary laceration fills with blood. A lung laceration filled with air is called a pneumatocele. In some cases, both pneumatoceles and hematomas exist in the same injured lung. Pulmonary hematomas take longer to heal than simple pneumatoceles and commonly leave the lungs scarred. A pulmonary contusion is another cause of bleeding within the lung tissue, but these result from microhemorrhages, multiple small bleeds, and the bleeding is not a discrete mass but rather occurs within the lung tissue. An indication of more severe damage to the lung than pulmonary contusion, a hematoma also takes longer to clear. Unlike contusions, hematomas do not usually interfere with gas exchange in the lung, but they do increase the risk of infection and abscess formation.
