= Pneumatocele =

Cavity in the lung parenchyma

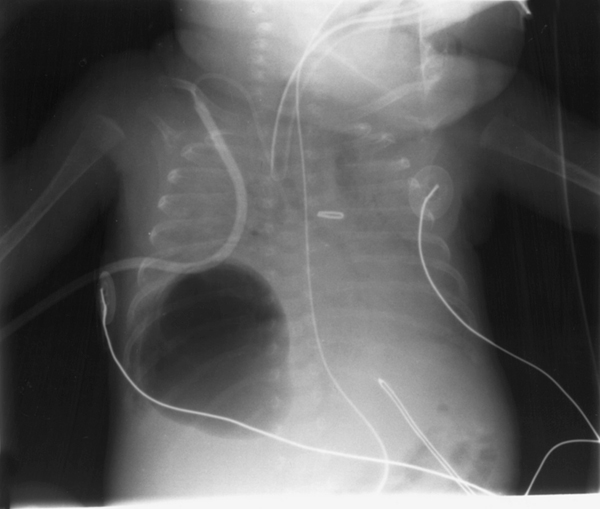
Large, right lower lobe pneumatocele is shown, compromising ventilation in a premature infant with RDS and superimposed RSV pneumonitis.

A pneumatocele is a cavity in the lung parenchyma filled with air that may result from pulmonary trauma during mechanical ventilation.

Gas-filled, or air-filled lesions in bone are known as pneumocysts. When a pneumocyst is found in a bone it is called an intraosseous pneumocyst, or a vertebral pneumocyst when found in a vertebra.

== Cause ==
A pneumatocele results when a lung laceration, a cut or tear in the lung tissue, fills with air. A rupture of a small airway creates the air-filled cavity. Pulmonary lacerations that fill with blood are called pulmonary hematomas. In some cases, both pneumatoceles and hematomas exist in the same injured lung. A pneumatocele can become enlarged, for example when the patient is mechanically ventilated or has acute respiratory distress syndrome, in which case it may not go away for months.

Intraosseous pneumatocysts in the bone are rare and of unclear origin. They are benign and usually without symptoms. They are also found around a sacroiliac joint, and there has been one reported case of an acetabular pneumocyst.

== Diagnosis ==
Diagnosis can be made using chest X-ray; the lesion shows up as a small, round area filled with air. Computed tomography can give a more detailed understanding of the lesion. Differential diagnoses – other conditions that could cause similar symptoms as pneumatocele include lung cancer, tuberculosis, and a lung abscess in the setting of hyper IgE syndrome (a.k.a. Job's syndrome), as a complication of COVID-19 pneumonitis, or on its own, often caused by Staphylococcus aureus infection during cystic fibrosis.

== Management and treatment ==
Treatment typically is supportive and includes monitoring and observation.
