= Rib fracture =

Break in a rib bone

- Other names: Broken rib, cracked rib
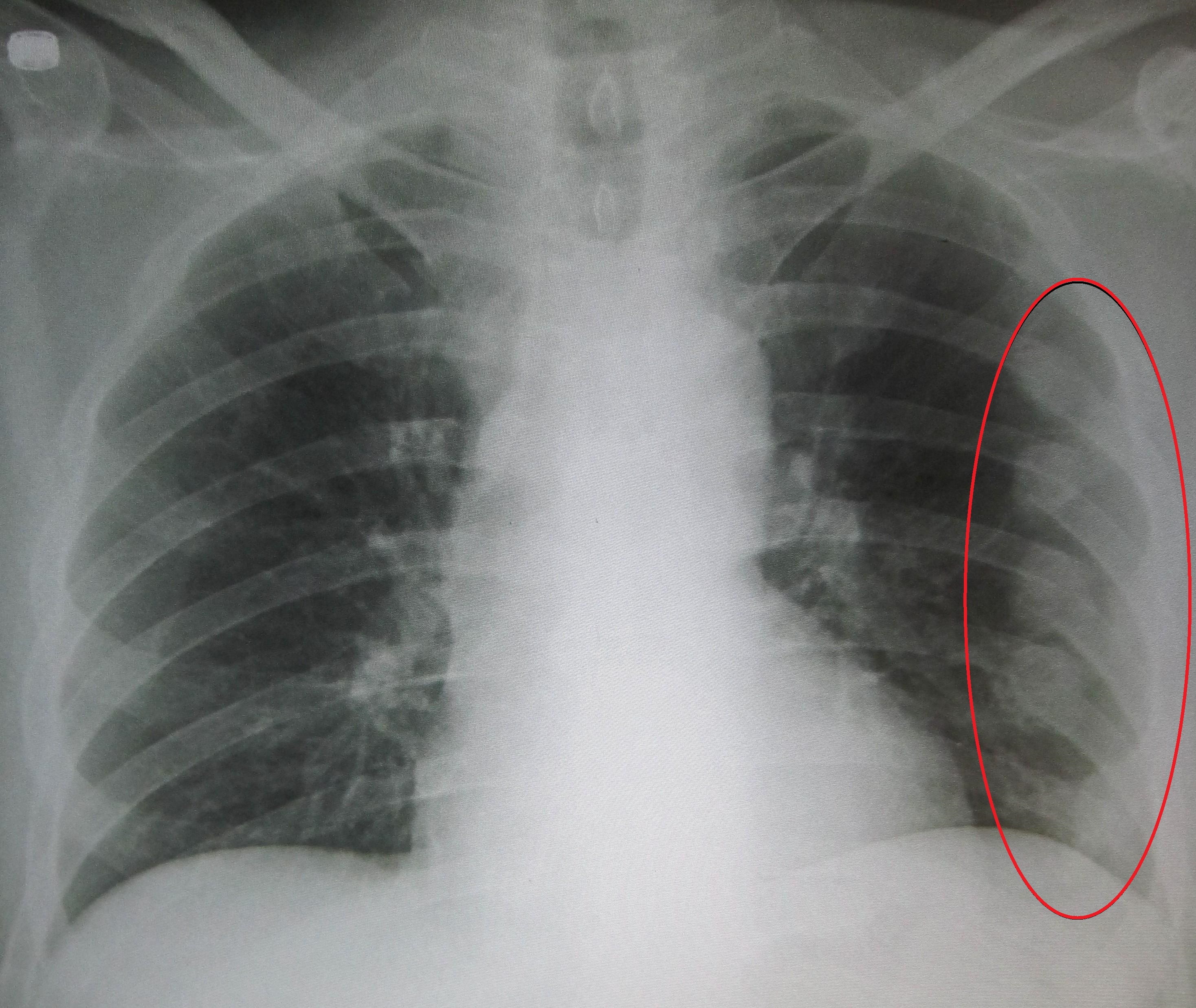
- An X ray showing multiple old fractured ribs of the person's left side as marked by the oval
- Specialty: Emergency medicine, cardiothoracic surgery, trauma surgery
- Symptoms: Chest pain that is worse with breathing
- Complications: Pulmonary contusion, pneumothorax, pneumonia
- Causes: Chest trauma, disease, coughing
- Diagnostic method: Based on symptoms, medical imaging
- Medication: Paracetamol (acetaminophen), NSAIDs, opioids
- Prognosis: Pain improves over 6 weeks
- Frequency: Common

A rib fracture is a break in a rib bone. This typically results in chest pain that is worse with inspiration. Bruising may occur at the site of the break. When several ribs are broken in several places a flail chest results. Potential complications include a pneumothorax, pulmonary contusion, and pneumonia.

Rib fractures usually occur from a direct blow to the chest such as during a motor vehicle collision or from a crush injury. Coughing or metastatic cancer may also result in a broken rib. The middle ribs are most commonly fractured. Fractures of the first or second ribs are more likely to be associated with complications. Diagnosis can be made based on symptoms and supported by medical imaging.

Pain control is an important part of treatment. This may include the use of paracetamol (acetaminophen), NSAIDs, or opioids. A nerve block may be another option. While fractured ribs can be wrapped, this may increase complications. In those with a flail chest, surgery may improve outcomes. They are a common injury following trauma.

== Causes ==
Rib fractures can occur with or without direct trauma during recreational activity. Cardiopulmonary resuscitation (CPR) has also been known to cause thoracic injury, including but not limited to rib and sternum fractures. They can also occur as a consequence of diseases such as cancer or rheumatoid arthritis. An exceptionally powerful cough, such as that which can occur in whooping cough, may also result in a broken rib. While for elderly individuals a fall can cause a rib fracture, in adults automobile accidents are a common event for such an injury.

== Diagnosis ==
Signs of a broken rib may include:

- Pain on inhalation
- Swelling in chest area
- Bruise in chest area
- Increasing shortness of breath
- Coughing up blood (rib may have damaged lung)

Plain X-rays often pick up displaced fractures but often miss undisplaced fractures. CT scanning is generally able to pick up both types of fractures.

Because children have more flexible chest walls than adults do, their ribs are more likely to bend than to break; therefore the presence of rib fractures in children is evidence of a significant amount of force and may indicate severe thoracic injuries such as pulmonary contusion. Rib fractures are also a sign of more serious injury in elderly people.

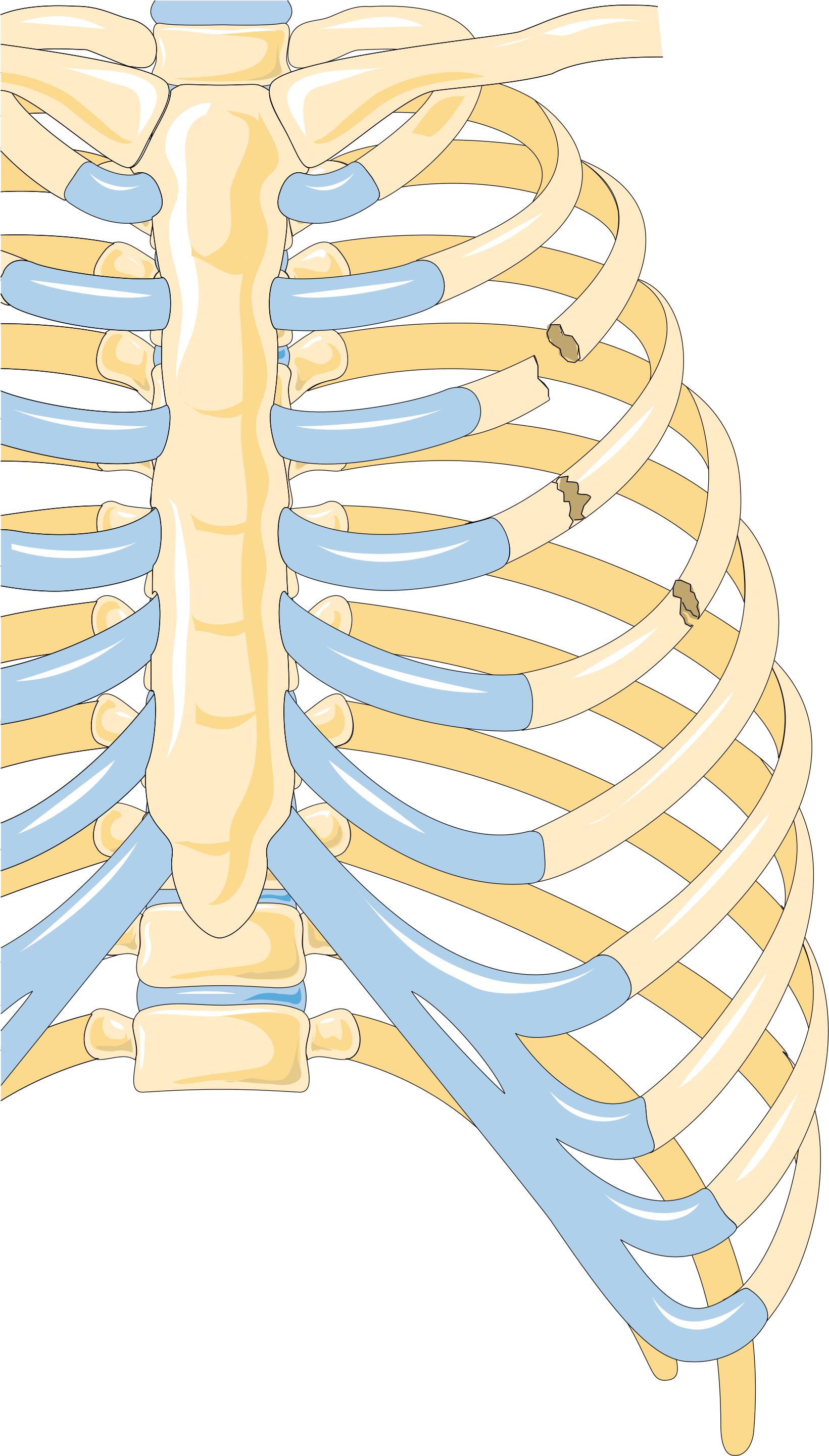
Illustration showing rib fracture at 3rd, 4th and 5th rib

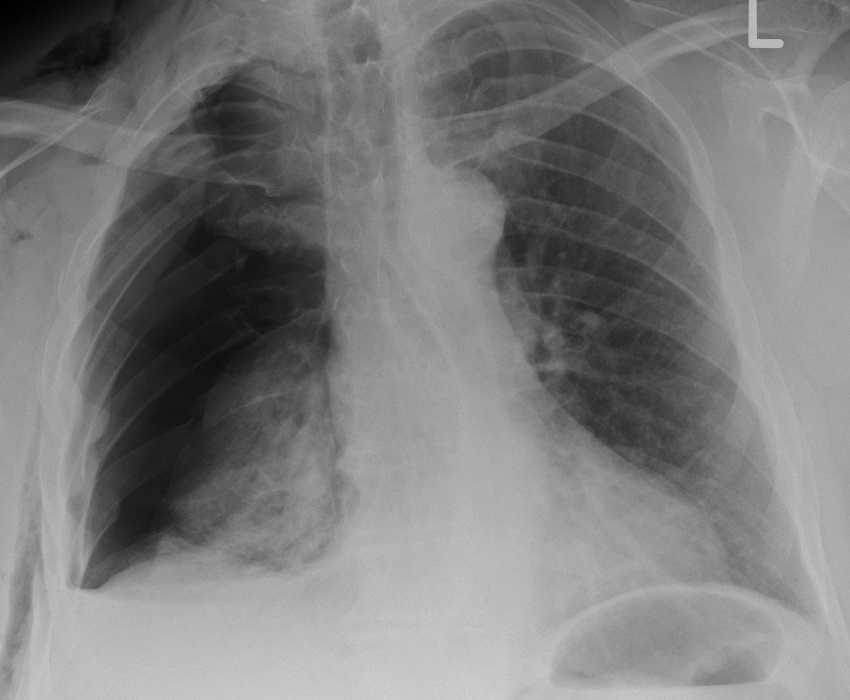
Right sided pneumothorax and rib fractures

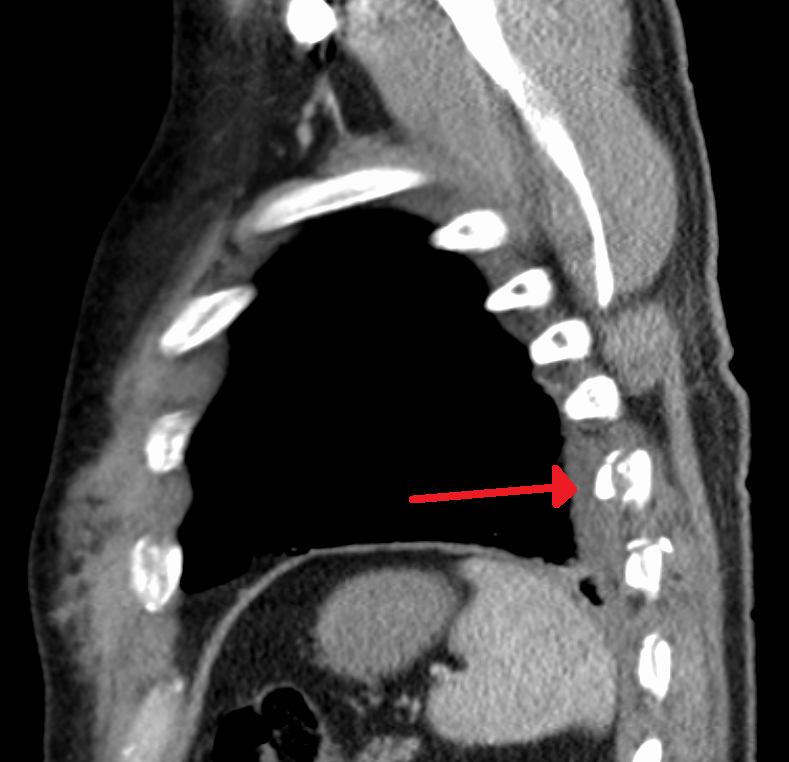
Two broken ribs as seen on parasagittal CT

== Treatment ==
There is no specific treatment for rib fractures, but various supportive measures can be taken. In simple rib fractures, pain can lead to reduced movement and cough suppression; this can contribute to the formation of secondary chest infection. Flail chest is a potentially life-threatening injury and will often require a period of assisted ventilation. Flail chest and first rib fractures are high-energy injuries and should prompt investigation of damage to underlying viscera (e.g., lung contusion) or remotely (e.g., cervical spine injury). Spontaneous fractures in athletes generally require a cessation of the cause, e.g., time off rowing, while maintaining cardiovascular fitness.

=== Nerve blocks ===
Nerve blocks may be used to help with pain and reduce respiratory complications related to rib fractures. These include rhomboid intercostal block, epidural anesthesia, paravertebral block, erector spinae plane block and serratus anterior plane block. There is very little evidence to support the use of one nerve block over another on the basis of analgesia or safety.

=== Surgery ===
Treatment options for internal fixation/repair of rib fractures include:

- Judet and/or sanchez plates/struts are a metal plate with strips that bend around the rib and then is further secured with sutures.
- There are different specialist rib fixation systems on the market. They have two options: a precontoured metal plate that uses screws to secure the plate to the rib; and/or an intramedullary splint which is tunneled into the rib and secured with a set screw.
- Anterior locking plates are metal plates that have holes for screws throughout the plate. The plate is positioned over the rib and screwed into the bone at the desired position. The plates may be bent to match the contour of the section.
- U-plates can also be used as they clamp on to the superior aspect of the ribs using locking screws.

== See also ==
- Pulmonary hygiene
