= Flail chest =

- Other names: Paradoxical breathing
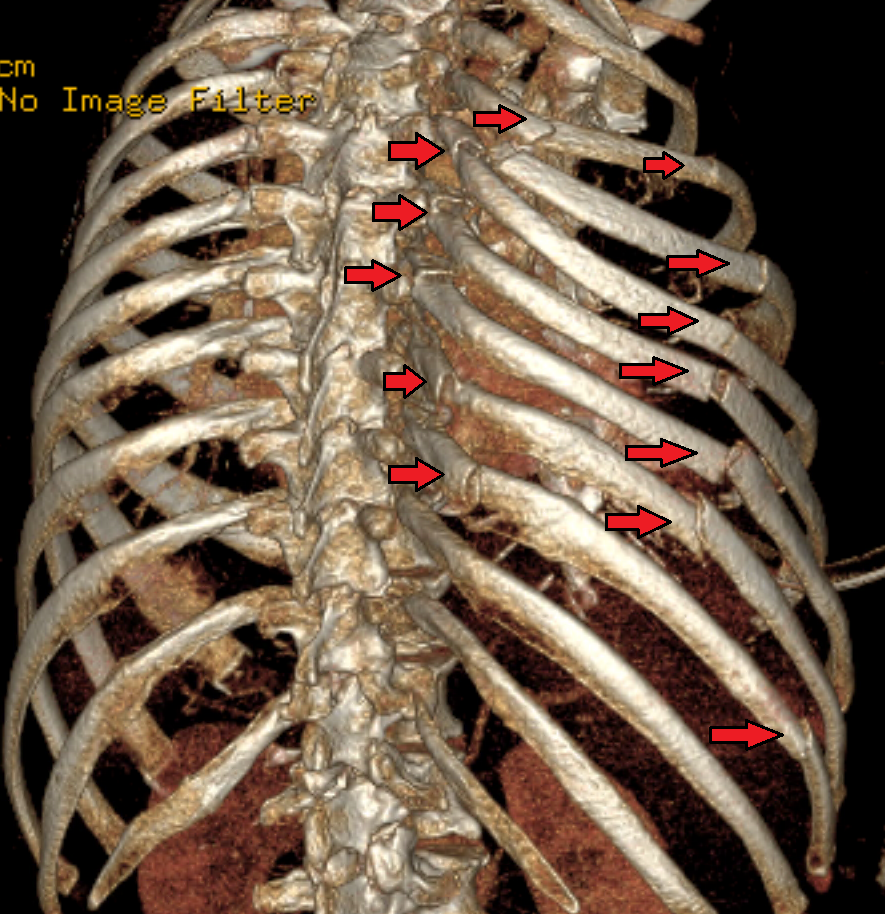
- A 3D reconstruction from a CT scan showing a flail chest. Arrows mark the rib fractures.
- Specialty: Thoracic surgery, Trauma surgery
- Complications: Pneumothorax

Flail chest is a life-threatening medical condition that occurs when a segment of the rib cage breaks due to trauma and becomes detached from the rest of the chest wall. Two of the symptoms of flail chest are chest pain and shortness of breath.

It occurs when multiple adjacent ribs are broken in multiple places, separating a segment, so a part of the chest wall moves independently. The number of ribs that must be broken varies by differing definitions: some sources say at least two adjacent ribs are broken in at least two places, some require three or more ribs in two or more places. The flail segment moves in the opposite direction to the rest of the chest wall: because of the ambient pressure in comparison to the pressure inside the lungs, it goes in while the rest of the chest is moving out, and vice versa. This so-called "paradoxical breathing" is painful and increases the work involved in breathing.

Flail chest is usually accompanied by a pulmonary contusion, a bruise of the lung tissue that can interfere with blood oxygenation. Often, it is the contusion, not the flail segment, that is the main cause of respiratory problems in people with both injuries.

Surgery to fix the fractures appears to result in better outcomes.

== Signs and symptoms ==
Two of the symptoms of flail chest are chest pain and shortness of breath.

The characteristic paradoxical motion of the flail segment occurs due to pressure changes associated with respiration that the rib cage normally resists:

- During normal inspiration, the diaphragm contracts and intercostal muscles pull the rib cage out. Pressure in the thorax decreases below atmospheric pressure, and air rushes in through the trachea. The flail segment will be pulled in with the decrease in pressure while the rest of the rib cage expands.
- During normal expiration, the diaphragm and intercostal muscles relax increasing internal pressure, allowing the abdominal organs to push air upwards and out of the thorax. However, a flail segment will also be pushed out while the rest of the rib cage contracts.

Paradoxical motion is a late sign of flail segment; therefore, an absence of paradoxical motion does not mean the patient does not have a flail segment.

The constant motion of the ribs in the flail segment at the site of the fracture is extremely painful, and, untreated, the sharp broken edges of the ribs are likely to eventually puncture the pleural sac and lung, possibly causing a pneumothorax. The concern about "mediastinal flutter" (the shift of the mediastinum with paradoxical diaphragm movement) does not appear to be merited. Pulmonary contusions are commonly associated with flail chest and that can lead to respiratory failure. This is due to the paradoxical motions of the chest wall from the fragments interrupting normal breathing and chest movement. Typical paradoxical motion is associated with stiff lungs, which requires extra work for normal breathing, and increased lung resistance, which makes air flow difficult. The respiratory failure from the flail chest requires mechanical ventilation and a longer stay in an intensive care unit. It is the damage to the lungs from the flail segment that is life-threatening.

== Causes ==
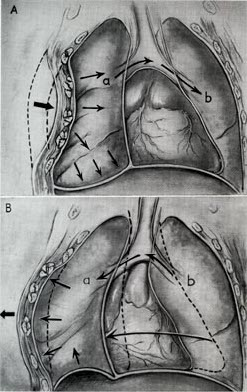
Diagrams depicting the paradoxical motion observed during respiration with a flail segment

The most common causes of flail chest injuries are vehicle collisions, which account for 76% of flail chest injuries. Another main cause of flail chest injuries is falling. This mainly occurs in the elderly, who are more impacted by the falls as a result of their weak and frail bones, unlike their younger counterparts who can fall without being impacted as severely. Falls account for 14% of flail chest injuries.

Flail chest typically occurs when three or more adjacent ribs are fractured in two or more places, allowing that segment of the thoracic wall to displace and move independently of the rest of the chest wall. Flail chest can also occur when ribs are fractured proximally in conjunction with disarticulation of costal cartilages distally. For the condition to occur, generally there must be a significant force applied over a large surface of the thorax to create the multiple anterior and posterior rib fractures. Rollover and crushing injuries most commonly break ribs at only one point, whereas for flail chest to occur a significant impact is required, breaking the ribs in two or more places. This can be caused by forceful accidents such as the aforementioned vehicle collisions or significant falls. In the elderly, it can be caused by deterioration of bone, although rare. In children, the majority of flail chest injuries result from common blunt force traumas or metabolic bone diseases, including a group of genetic disorders known as osteogenesis imperfecta.

== Diagnosis ==
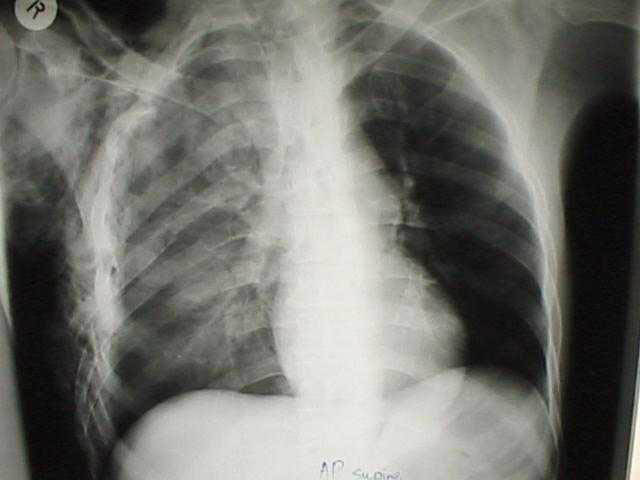
A chest radiograph of a flail chest associated with right sided pulmonary contusion and subcutaneous emphysema

Diagnosis is by physical examination performed by a physician. The diagnosis may be assisted or confirmed by use of medical imaging with either plain X ray or CT scan. Paradoxial movements of flail segments. Crepitus and tenderness near fractured ribs.

== Treatment ==
Treatment of the flail chest initially follows the principles of advanced trauma life support. Further treatment includes:

- Good pain management includes early regional anesthesia (e.g. intercostal blocks or erector spinae plane blocks) and avoiding opioid pain medication as much as possible. This allows much better ventilation, with improved tidal volume, and increased blood oxygenation.
- Positive pressure ventilation, meticulously adjusting the ventilator settings to avoid pulmonary barotrauma.
- Chest tubes as required.
- Adjustment of position to make the person most comfortable and provide relief of pain.
- Aggressive pulmonary toilet

A person may be intubated with a double lumen tracheal tube. In a double lumen endotracheal tube, each lumen may be connected to a different ventilator. Usually one side of the chest is affected more than the other, so each lung may require drastically different pressures and flows to adequately ventilate.

Surgical fixation can help in significantly reducing the duration of ventilatory support and in conserving the pulmonary function. Surgical intervention has also been shown to reduce the need for tracheostomy, reduces the time spent in the intensive care unit following a traumatic flail chest injury and could reduce the risk of acquiring pneumonia after such an event.

=== Physiotherapy ===
In order to begin a rehabilitation program for a flail chest it is important to treat the person's pain so they are able to perform the proper exercises. Due to the underlying conditions that the flail segment has caused onto the respiratory system, chest physiotherapy is important to reduce further complications. Proper positioning of the body is key, including postural alignment for proper drainage of mucous secretions. The therapy will consist of a variety of postural positioning and changes in order to increase normal breathing. Along with postural repositioning, a variety of breathing exercises are also very important in order to allow the chest wall to reposition itself back to normal conditions. Breathing exercises will also include coughing procedures. Furthermore, range of motion exercises are given to reduce the atrophy of the musculature. With progression, resistance exercises are added to the regimen to the shoulder and arm of the side containing the injury. Moreover, trunk exercises will be introduced while sitting and will progress to during standing. Hip flexion exercises can be done to expand the thorax. This is done by lying supine on a flat surface, flexing the knees and hips and bringing them in toward the chest. The knees should come in toward the chest while the person inhales, and exhale when the knees are lowered. This exercise can be done in 3 sets of 6–8 repetitions with a pause in between sets. The person should always make sure to maintain controlled breaths.

Eventually, the person will be progressed to walking and posture correction while walking. Before the person is discharged from the hospital, the person should be able to perform mobility exercises to the core and should have attained good posture.

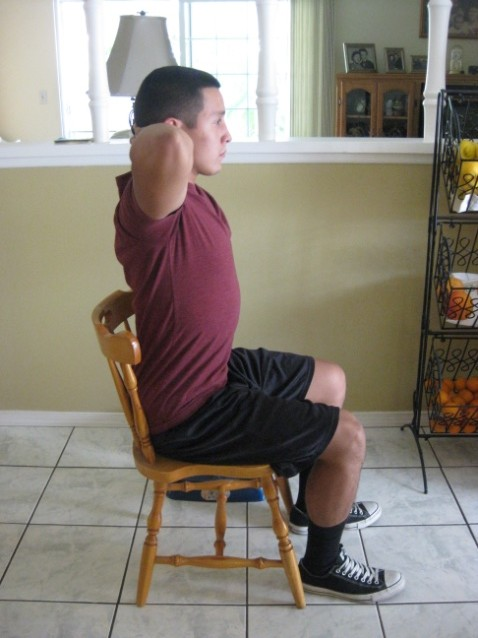
Mobilization of the chest and pectoral muscle stretch. During inspiration, the person will clasp hands behind the head and will horizontally abduct the arms.

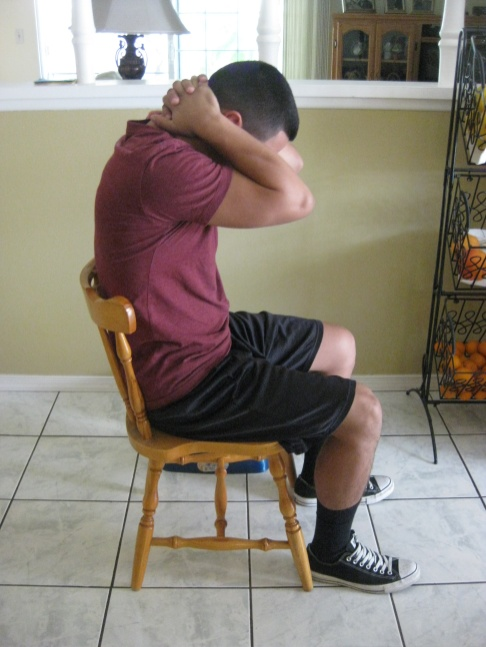
During exhalation, the person will bend forward bringing the elbows together.

== Prognosis ==
The death rate of people with flail chest depends on the severity of their condition, ranging from 10 to 25%. A systematic review comparing the safety and effectiveness of surgical fixation versus non-surgical methods for the treatment of flail chest, reported that there was no statistically significant difference in the reported deaths between patients treated surgically and those treated non-surgically i.e. with conservative management methods. The results of the systematic review suggested that surgical intervention reduces the need for tracheostomy, reduces the time spent in the intensive care unit following a traumatic flail chest injury and could reduce the risk of acquiring pneumonia after such an event.

== Epidemiology ==
Approximately 1 out of 13 people admitted to the hospital with fractured ribs are found to have flail chest.
