= Thoracic aorta injury =

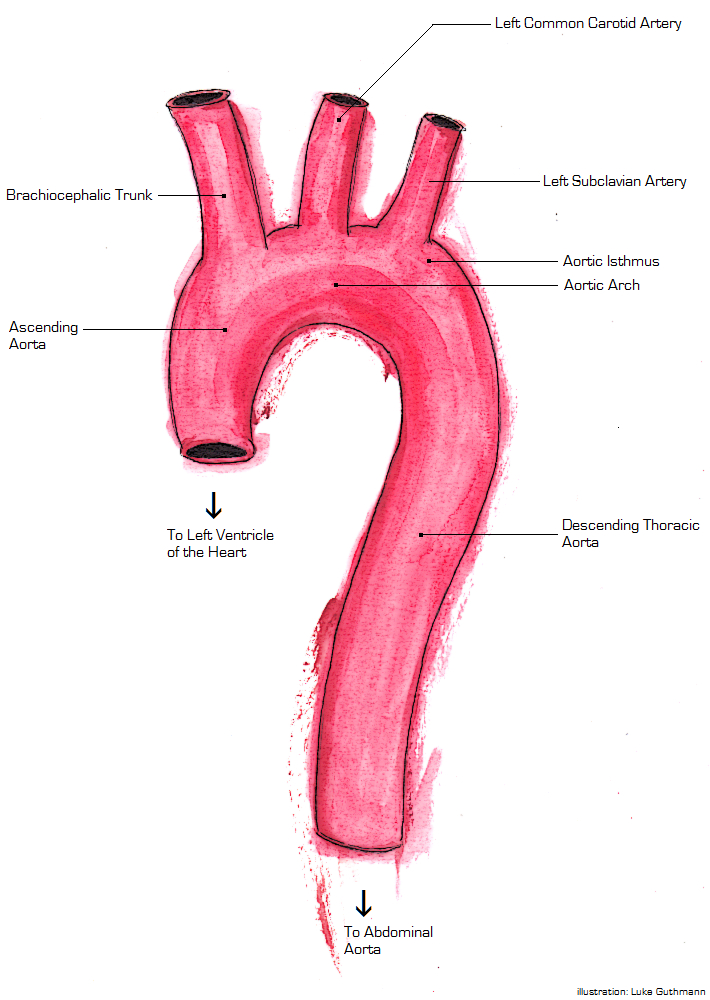
- Anatomy of the thoracic aorta

Injury of the thoracic aorta refers to any injury which affects the portion of the aorta which lies within the chest cavity. Injuries of the thoracic aorta are usually the result of physical trauma; however, they can also be the result of a pathological process. The main causes of this injury are deceleration (such as a car accident) and crush injuries. There are different grades to injuries to the aorta depending on the extent of injury, and the treatment whether surgical or medical depends on that grade. It is difficult to determine if a patient has a thoracic injury just by their symptoms, but through imaging and a physical exam the extent of injury can be determined. All patients with a thoracic aortic injury need to be treated either surgically with endovascular repair or open surgical repair or with medicine to keep their blood pressure and heart rate in the appropriate range. However, most patients that have a thoracic aortic injury do not live for 24 hours.

== Mechanism ==
Injuries to the aorta are usually the result of trauma, such as deceleration and crush injuries. Deceleration injuries almost always occur during high speed impacts, such as those in motor vehicle crashes and falls from a substantial height. Several mechanical processes can occur and are reflected in the injury itself. A more recently proposed mechanism is that the aorta can be compressed between bony structures (such as the manubrium, clavicle, and first rib) and the spine. In the ascending aorta (the portion of the aorta which is almost vertical), one mechanism of injury is torsion (a two-way twisting). There are clinical predictors of an aortic injury. The predictors include if a patient is older than 50, was an unrestrained patient, has hypotension, has a thoracic injury requiring thoracotomy, has a spinal injury, or has a head injury. If four of these criteria are met their likelihood for an aortic injury is 30%

The aortic wall is made up of three different components the inner layer (intima), the muscle layer (media), and the outer layer (adventitia). A traumatic injury to the thoracic aorta can cause disruption of any of these parts. Therefore, aortic injury is on a scale from injury to a part of the inner layer to a complete tear of all three layers.

There are 4 grades of aortic injury.

- Type I: Intimal tear
- Type II: Intramural hematoma
- Type III: Pseudoaneurysm
- Type IV: Rupture

In addition to the 4 grades of aortic injury, the risk of rupture can also be categorized. If both the inner layer and the muscle layer of the aortic wall are both involved in the injury then the injury is categorized as significant aortic injury. If just the inner layer and a portion of the muscle layer are involved in the injury then the injury is characterized as minimal aortic injury. Radiographically this would be seen as an intimal flap less than 1 cm in size.

Between the mobile ascending aorta and the relatively fixed descending thoracic aorta is the aortic isthmus. When there is a sudden deceleration the mobile ascending aorta pushes forward creating a whiplash effect on the aortic isthmus. However, a different mechanism is involved when the ascending aorta proximal to the isthmus is torn. When there is a rapid deceleration the heart is pushed to the left posterior chest. This causes a sudden increase in intra-aortic pressure and can cause aortic rupture. This is known as the water hammer effect.

Based on the location of the injury in the thorax subsequent injuries can take place. If the injury is in the descending thoracic aorta this could lead to a hemothorax. Where as an injury to the ascending aorta could lead to hemoperricardium and subsequent tamponade or could compress the SVC.

== Symptoms ==
It is difficult to rely on symptoms to diagnose a thoracic aortic injury. However some symptoms do include severe chest pain, cough, shortness of breath, difficulty swallowing due to compression of the esophagus, back pain, and hoarseness due to involvement of the recurrent laryngeal nerve. There might be external signs such as bruising on the anterior chest wall due to a traumatic injury. Clinical signs are uncommon and nonspecific but can include generalized hypertension due to the injury involving the sympathetic afferent nerves in the aortic isthmus. A murmur can also be audible as turbulent blood flow goes over the tear.

== Diagnosis ==
=== Classification ===
There are inconsistencies in the terminology of aortic injury. There are several terms which are interchangeably used to describe injury to the aorta such as tear, laceration, transection, and rupture. Laceration is used as a term for the consequence of a tear, whereas a transection is a section across an axis or cross section. For all intents and purposes, the latter is used when a tear occurs across all or nearly all of the circumference of the aorta. Rupture is defined as a forcible disruption of tissue. Some disagree with the usage of rupture as they believe it implies that a tear is incompatible with life; however, the term accurately gauges the severity of tears in the aorta. A rupture can be either complete or partial, and can be classified further by the position of the tear.

=== Imaging ===
The gold standard for diagnosis of thoracic aortic injury is aortography. This method involves inserting a catheter into the aorta and directly injecting contrast material. The primary benefit of aortography is the ability to precisely determine the location of injury for surgical planning. Another imaging modality is CT angiogram which has a sensitivity of 100%. A CT angiogram relies on timing the CT scan after a bolus of IV contrast is administered from a peripheral IV site. Since a CT angiogram has a sensitivity of 100% and less invasive due to the peripheral placement of the IV line than aortagraphy it is the primary imaging choice. This allows visualization of the aorta and provides precise locations of traumatic injury. A CT angiogram does show both direct and indirect signs of aortic injury. The indirect sign that you can see is effacement of fat due to a hematoma. This sign should clue in a radiologist that there is an underlying injury. Some direct signs from a CT include having an intimal flap, irregularity of the shape of the aorta, filling defects secondary to a thrombus, or out pouching of the aorta.

However, non contrasted CT scans, chest X-rays, and transesophageal echos can also be used. Chest X-rays most sensitive finding is a widened mediastinum of greater than 8 cm. An apical cap and displacement of the trachea to either side of the chest from midline can also be seen. A normal chest X-ray, however, does not exclude a diagnosis of thoracic aortic injury. A chest X-ray can also be useful to diagnose subsequent problems caused by aortic rupture such as pneumothorax or hemothorax. Non contrasted CT scans might show an intimal flap, periaortic hematoma, luminal filling defect, aortic contour abnormality, pseudoaneurysm, contained rupture, vessel wall disruption, active extravasation of intravenous contrast from the aorta and is therefore useful to assess for minimal aortic injury. Trans esophageal echos are useful in patients that are hemodynamically unstable, but the sensitivity and specificity of this study varies based on clinical user. The trans esophageal echo relies on placement an ultrasound probe into the patient's esophagus in order to get an ultrasound of the heart. If esophageal injury is expected, the patient has a facial injury, or if the patient has difficulty maintaining their away then the trans esophageal echo is contraindicated.

== Treatment ==
The first line treatment for patients with thoracic aortic injury is maintaining the patient's airway with intubation and treating secondary injuries such as a hemothorax. After ensuring the patient has a patent airway and other life-threatening injuries are treated then treatment for the aortic injury can be started.

Due to the constant risk of sudden rupture or exsanguination urgent treatment is necessary. A patient can either undergo endovascular repair or surgical repair. Endovascular repair is the current gold standard due to increased success rates and lower complications. Patients that are able to undergo endovascular repair without contraindications should proceed with it. Repair should be delayed if there is life-threatening intra-abdominal or intracranial bleeding or if the patient is at risk for infection.

=== Endovascular Repair ===
Endovascular repair is done by first gaining vascular access usually through the femoral artery. A catheter is inserted to the point of injury and a luminal stent is deployed. Blood is then able to be pumped through the stent and prevent the aortic wall from rupturing.

=== Open Surgical Repair ===
Surgical repair is done by way of a thoracotomy or opening of the chest wall. From this point multiple methods can be used, but the most successful methods enable distal perfusion to prevent ischemia. When the surgery is performed a constant check of blood flow to the parts of the body away from the injury should be monitored to know if oxygenation is occurring.

=== Medical Management ===
While waiting for surgery careful regulation of blood pressure and heart rate is necessary. Systolic blood pressure should be maintained between 100 and 120 mmHg allowing for perfusion distal to the injury but decreasing the risk of rupture while the heart rate should be kept under 100 beats per minute. Esmolol is first choice to maintain blood pressure and heart rate due to its short time of action, but if the blood pressure is not within range adding nitroprusside sodium can be added as a second agent. The treatment is similar to what is done for aortic dissections.

If the patient has minimal aortic injury then the patient can be managed non surgically. Rather the patient can be followed with serial images. If the patient does develop a more severe injury including a full thickness injury through the media layer then the patient should be treated with surgery.

== Outcomes ==
Thoracic aortic injury is the 2nd leading cause of death involving both blunt trauma. 80% of patients that have a thoracic aortic injury will die immediately. Of the patients that do make it to be evaluated only 50% will survive 24 hours. Of the patients that do survive the first 24 hours 14% develop paraplegia.

== Epidemiology ==
Thoracic aortic injury is most commonly caused by a penetrating trauma in up to 90% of cases. Of these cases around 28% are confined to the thoracic portion of the aorta including the ascending aorta, aorta arch, and the descending aorta. Of the thoracic aortic injuries the ligament arteriosum is the most common location followed by the portion of the aorta after the origin of the left subclavian artery. The most common mechanism leading to thoracic aortic injury is a motor vehicle collision. Other mechanisms include airplane crashes, falling from a large height and landing on a hard surface, or any injury that causes substantial pressure to the sternum. The incidence of thoracic aortic injuries is approximately 1 in 100,000.
