= Hemopneumothorax =

- Specialty: Emergency medicine

Hemopneumothorax, or haemopneumothorax, is the condition of having both air (pneumothorax) and blood (hemothorax) in the chest cavity. A hemothorax, pneumothorax, or the combination of both can occur due to an injury to the lung or chest.

== Cause ==
The pleural space is located anatomically between the visceral membrane, which is firmly attached to the lungs, and the parietal membrane which is firmly attached to the chest wall (a.k.a. ribcage and intercostal muscles, muscles between the ribs). The pleural space contains pleural fluid. This fluid holds the two membranes together by surface tension, as much as a drop of water between two sheets of glass prevents them from separating. Because of this, when the intercostal muscles move the ribcage outward, the lungs are pulled out as well, dropping the pressure in the lungs and pulling air into the bronchi, when we 'breathe in'. The pleural space is maintained in a constant state of negative pressure (in comparison to atmospheric pressure).

If the chest wall, and thus the pleural space, is punctured, blood, air or both can enter the pleural space. Air and/or blood rushes into the space in order to equalise the pressure with that of the atmosphere. As a result, the fluid is disrupted and the two membranes no longer adhere to each other. When the rib cage moves out, it no longer pulls the lungs with it. Thus the lungs cannot expand, the pressure in the lungs never drops and no air is pulled into the bronchi. Respiration is not possible. The affected lung, which has a great deal of elastic tissue, shrivels in what is referred to as a collapsed lung.

== Diagnosis ==
If you have an injury or trauma to your chest, your doctor may order a chest X-ray to help see if fluid or air is building up within the chest cavity.

Other diagnostic tests may also be performed to further evaluate the fluid in around the lungs, for instance a chest CT scan or an ultrasound. An ultrasound of the chest will show the amount of fluid and its exact location.

== Treatment ==
Treatment for this condition is the same as for hemothorax and pneumothorax independently: by tube thoracostomy, the insertion of a chest drain through an incision made between the ribs, into the intercostal space. A chest tube must be inserted to drain blood and air from the pleural space so it can return to a state of negative pressure and function normally.

Commonly, surgery is needed to close off whatever injuries caused the blood and air to enter the cavity (e.g. stabbing, broken ribs).

== See also ==
- Catamenial pneumothorax
- Tension pneumothorax
- Pulmonary contusion
