= Chest physiotherapy =

Treatments to improve breathing by indirect removal of mucus from breathing passage

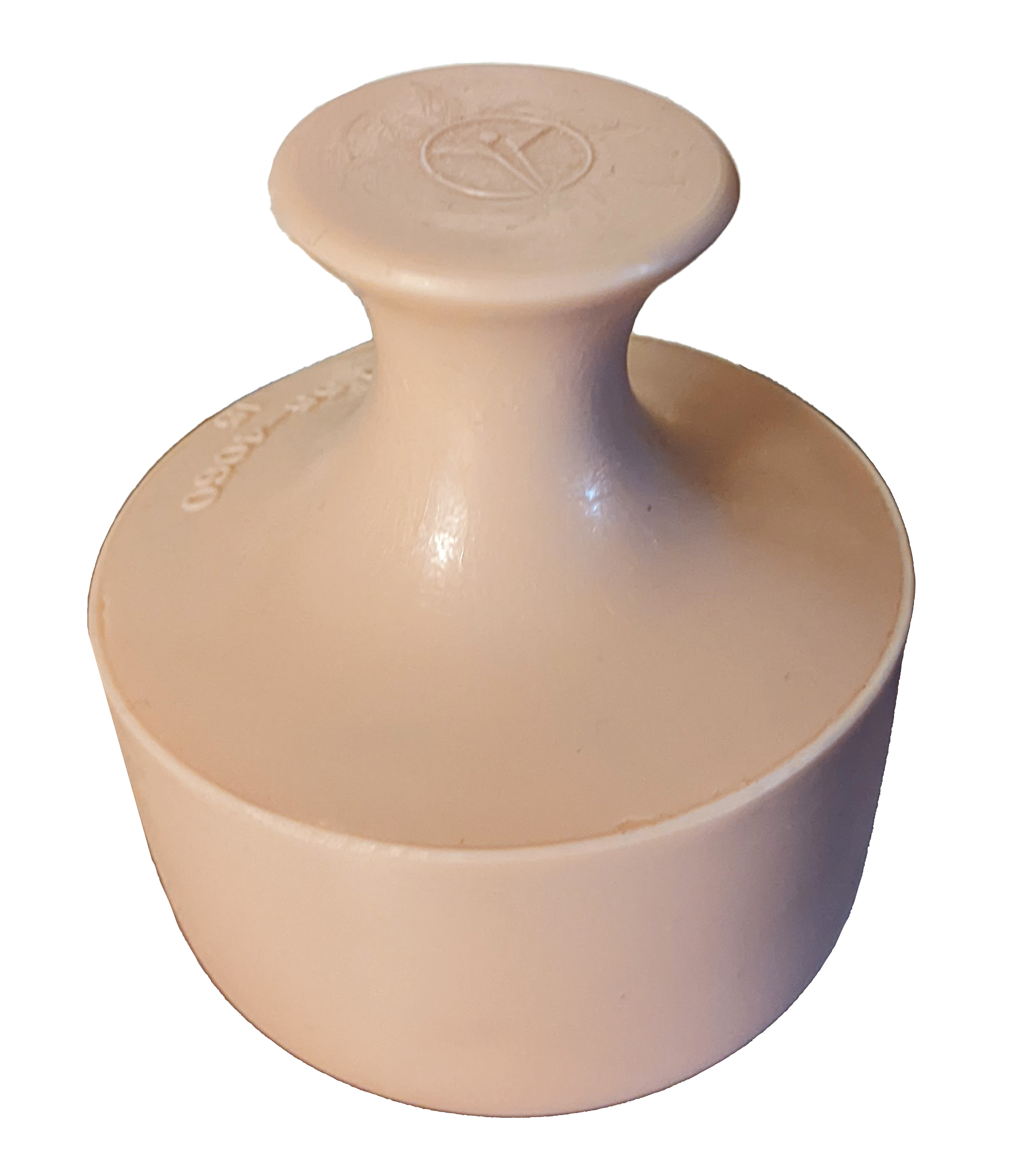
- Specialty: Respiratory therapist

Chest physiotherapy (CPT) are treatments generally performed by physical therapists and respiratory therapists, whereby breathing is improved by the indirect removal of mucus from the breathing passages of a patient. Other terms include respiratory or cardio-thoracic physiotherapy.

CPT are treatments which are performed on people who have mucus dysfunction in respiratory disease conditions like asthma, chronic obstructive pulmonary disease, bronchitis, bronchiectasis and cystic fibrosis. These respiratory conditions all have a common requirement of chest physiotherapy to assist the mucus clearance due to defects with mucociliary clearance.

Techniques include chest percussion using clapping: the therapist lightly claps the patient's chest, back, and area under the arms. Percussion, while effective in the treatment of infants and children, is no longer used in adults due to the introduction of more effective and self-management focused treatments. These include oscillating positive expiratory pressure devices or OPEP devices like "Flutter", "Aerobika", "AirPhysio", "Pari O-PEP", or positive expiratory pressure PEP devices like the "Acapella" and PEP masks or devices for positive airway pressure, as well as specific exercise regimes. The exercises prescribed can include specific respiratory exercises, for example autogenic drainage, as well as general cardiovascular exercises that assist the body to remove sputum and improve the efficiency of oxygen uptake in muscles.

There is no strong evidence to recommend chest physiotherapy as a routine treatment for adults who have pneumonia.

The objectives of chest physiotherapy are twofold. First, to obtain outcomes equal to and more effective than bronchoscopy without the invasiveness, trauma, and risk of hypoxemia, the complications of physician involvement, and the cost that bronchoscopy requires. Second, to specifically improve ventilation to areas of local lung obstruction.

If the objectives of the chest physiotherapy are achieved, an increase in local lung expansion should occur, and a parallel increase in perfusion to the affected area would result. If secretions are cleared from larger airways, airway resistance and obstruction should decrease. Clearance of secretions and improved ventilation of small airways should increase lung compliance. If clearance of secretions from both large and small airways occurs, it is reasonable to assume that the work of breathing and oxygen consumption should decrease and that gas exchange improve.

Further, if these objectives are achieved, the incidence of postoperative respiratory infection, morbidity, and hospital stay for those with acute and chronic lung diseases should be reduced.

== See also ==
- Postural drainage
