= Pulmonary hygiene =

Techniques to clear mucus from the airways

Pulmonary hygiene, or airway hygiene, also referred to as pulmonary toilet, together with airway clearance therapy uses a number of methods to clear mucus and secretions from the airways. The word pulmonary refers to the lungs. The word toilet, related to the French toilette, refers to body care and hygiene; this root is used in words such as toiletry that also relate to cleansing.

Respiratory health depends on the continuous clearance of airway secretions. Normal airway clearance is accomplished by two important mechanisms: mucociliary clearance and the basic cough reflex. Impaired mucociliary clearance is linked to poor lung function in a broad range of diseases and disabilities.

Pulmonary hygiene prevents atelectasis (the collapse of the alveoli of the lungs) and rids the respiratory system of secretions, which could cause respiratory infections. It can also decrease pulmonary shunting, increase the functional reserve capacity of the lungs, and prevent respiratory infection after chest trauma. Methods include using suction to remove fluids, and postural drainage, placing the patient in a position that allows secretions to drain by gravity.

== Methods ==
Methods used for pulmonary hygiene include suctioning of the airways, chest physiotherapy, and nasotracheal suction. Bronchoscopy, in which a tube is inserted into the airways so that an examiner can view them, can be used therapeutically as part of pulmonary hygiene. Incentive spirometry and use of analgesics (pain medications) that do not inhibit breathing are also parts of pulmonary toilet. Coughing is also important for ridding the airways of secretions, so healthcare providers are careful not to oversedate patients, because that could inhibit coughing. Tracheotomy facilitates pulmonary toilet. Chest percussion, another method, helps loosen secretions and allows the cilia of the airways to remove material. Positioning is another method for promoting drainage of secretions; sometimes patients are placed in a prone position to aid in this purpose.

=== Conventional chest physiotherapy ===
The most common treatment of atelectasis in the hospital setting is manual chest physiotherapy, though there is limited evidence of its efficacy. Chest percussion and postural drainage are used in bronchiectasis and lung abscess. The patient's body is positioned so that the trachea is inclined downward and below the affected chest area. Postural drainage is essential in treating bronchiectasis. Patients must receive physiotherapy to learn to tip themselves into a position in which the lobe to be drained is uppermost at least three times daily for up to 30 minutes during each session.

The treatment is often used in conjunction with a technique for loosening secretions in the chest cavity called chest percussion. Chest percussion is performed by clapping the back or chest with a cupped hand. Alternatively, a mechanical vibrator may be used in some cases to facilitate loosening of secretions. There are drainage positions for all segments of the lung. These positions are modified depending on the patient's condition and the location of the affected lung area.

=== Intermittent positive pressure breathing (physiotherapy) ===
Intermittent positive pressure breathing (IPPB) physiotherapy has long been used in the intensive care setting in non-intubated patients. Although widely accepted, few studies have validated its efficacy. In a Respiratory Care Clinical Practice Guideline, IPPB is suggested for patients who have impaired airway clearance, and for delivery of aerosolized medications to patients with neuromuscular weakness who are incapable of inhaling deeply. IPPB physiotherapy should be used with caution in patients with severe, uncontrolled bronchospasm or severe airway obstruction

=== Mechanical insufflation-exsufflation physiotherapy ===
People with neuromuscular weakness and atelectasis benefit from mechanical insufflation-exsufflation. Mechanically assisted coughing greatly improves secretion clearance in the setting of respiratory infection in the patient with neuromuscular disease and should be first-line therapy for this patient population. Mechanical insufflation-exsufflation physiotherapy is greatly aided by simultaneous manual augmentation of cough with either a thoracic squeeze or abdominal thrust during the expiratory phase (exhale). An American Thoracic Society consensus statement in 2004 supported the use of mechanical insufflation-exsufflation physiotherapy for patients with Duchenne muscular dystrophy. The use of this technique for children with neuromuscular disease has gained widespread acceptance in the United States and internationally.

== Applications ==
Pulmonary bronchial hygiene is used for preventing infections such as pneumonia. It is also used in the management of conditions such as pneumonia and cystic fibrosis. For people with chronic lung diseases, bronchial hygiene is used to prevent infections and lung abscesses. Bronchial hygiene is also used to prevent acute respiratory distress syndrome after chest trauma.

== Indications ==
The need for bronchial hygiene is indicated in cases of COPD, pneumonia and cystic fibrosis, both as interventional and prophylactic measures. Prophylactic indications also include pre and post thoracic surgery to prevent atelectasis and respiratory infections.

== Contraindications ==
The decision to use postural drainage therapy requires assessment of potential benefits versus potential risks. Therapy should be provided for no longer than necessary to obtain the desired therapeutic results. Some of the contraindications include an increased intracranial pressure (>20 mmHg), any spinal injury acute or otherwise, active hemoptysis, pulmonary embolism, pulmonary edema with congestive heart failure and an open or healing wound at the site where chest physiotherapy is otherwise indicated.

Medication contraindications vary depending on the medication being delivered.

== See also ==
- Airway clearance therapy, Airway management
- Respiratory therapy
- Chest physiotherapy
- ThAIRapy Vest
- Intrapulmonary percussive ventilator
