= Lower respiratory =

Lower respiratory can refer to:

- Lower respiratory tract infection
- Lower respiratory tract
