= Incentive spirometer =

Handheld device to improve lung function

- A typical incentive spirometer consists of an inhalation nozzle, which is seen facing toward the camera. The curved plastic on the left is a handle. The piston is in the middle (along with an adjustable mark to indicate a goal), and on the right side is a flow indicator showing whether the patient is inhaling too rapidly.
- Specialty: Pulmonology

An incentive spirometer is a handheld medical device used to help patients improve the functioning of their lungs. By training patients to take slow and deep breaths, this simplified spirometer facilitates lung expansion and strengthening. Patients inhale through a mouthpiece, which causes a piston inside the device to rise. This visual feedback helps them monitor their inspiratory effort. Incentive spirometers are commonly used after surgery or certain illnesses to prevent pulmonary complications.

== Overview ==
Incentive spirometer is indicated for patients who have had any surgery that might jeopardize respiratory function, particularly surgery to the lungs, but also to patients recovering from cardiac or other surgery involving extended time under anesthesia and prolonged in-bed recovery. Under general anesthesia and inactivity, a patient's breathing may slow, causing air sacs in their lungs to not fully inflate. Atelectasis can develop and, if unmanaged, lead to pneumonia and postoperative fever. Pneumonia is a major lung complication associated with increased morbidity and mortality, length of hospital stay, and likelihood of hospital readmissions. In conjunction with breathing exercises and early mobility, incentive spirometry use is therefore beneficial for patients recovering from pneumonia or rib damage to help minimize the chance of fluid build-up in the lungs. Because of its role in pulmonary rehabilitation and inspiratory muscle training, this device may theoretically benefit patients with COVID-19. It may be used as well by wind instrument players who want to improve their air flow.

== Indications ==
Incentive spirometer is indicated for the following reasons:

- Following abdominal or thoracic surgery to reduce risks of pulmonary complications including atelectasis and pneumonia
- Patients with prolonged immobilization and bed rest
- Chronic obstructive pulmonary disease
- COVID-19
- Cystic fibrosis
- Sickle cell anemia
- Mild to moderate asthma
- Traumatic rib fractures with subsequent complications of hemothorax and flail chest

== Contraindications ==
While there are no absolute contraindications for spirometry use, inspiratory muscle training can worsen some existing medical conditions, including the following:

- Recent or current respiratory tract infection
- Hemoptysis of unknown origin
- Pneumothorax
- Emphysema, due to increased barotrauma
- Thoracic, abdominal, or cerebral aneurysms
- Recent thoracic, abdominal, or eye surgery
- Nausea, vomiting, or acute illness
- Confusion or dementia
- Undiagnosed hypertension

== Usage ==
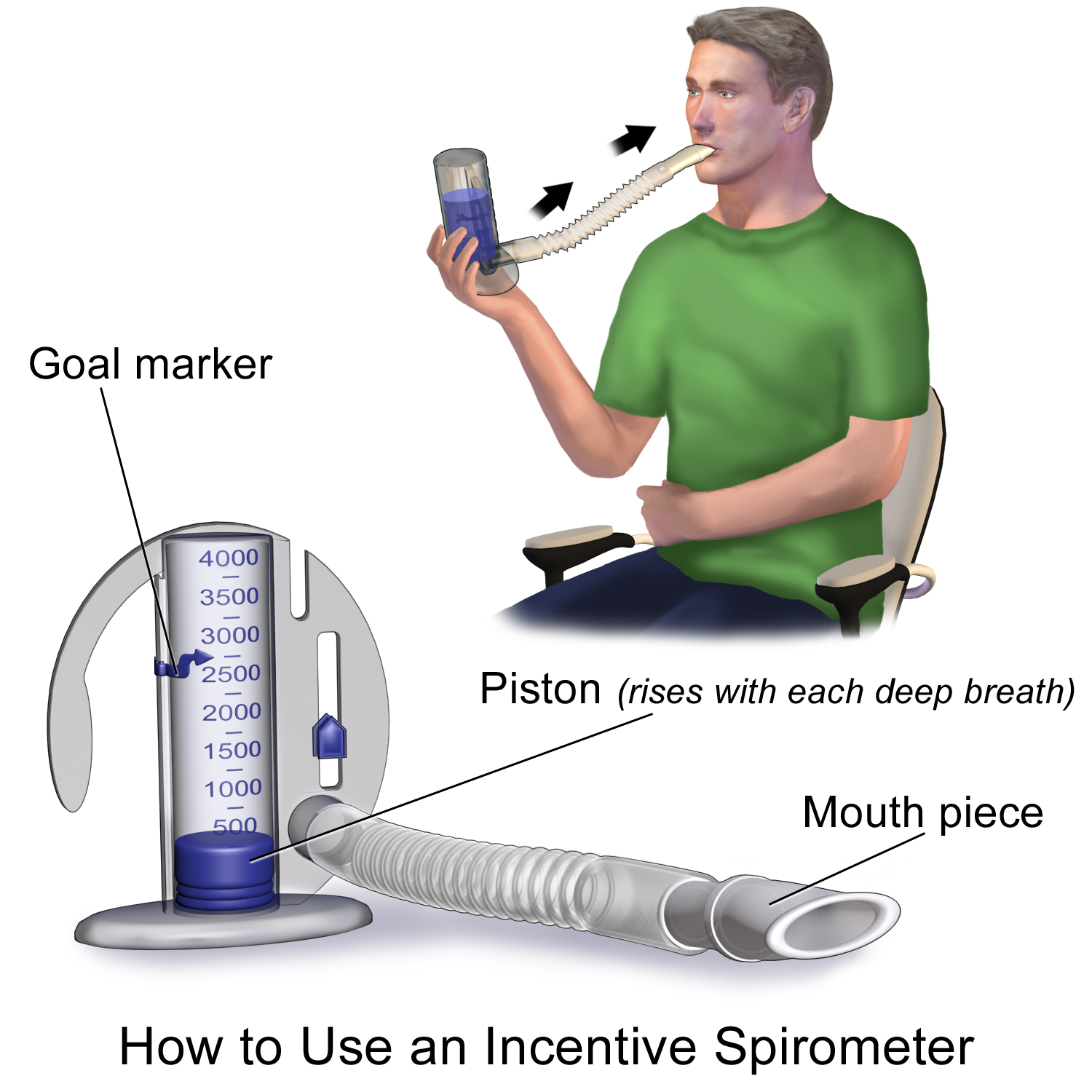
Depiction of the components of an incentive spirometer. The user is seated upright and holds the device in front of them. They breathe in air through the mouthpiece while watching the piston rise towards the goal marker.

Patient starts in a seated upright position. Patient exhales completely before using device. The patient then places the mouthpiece into their mouth and seals their lips tightly around it. The patient breathes in from the device as slowly and as deeply as possible, then holds that breath in for 2–6 seconds. This provides back pressure that pops open alveoli. It has the same effect as that which occurs during yawning. An indicator piston driven by the patient's breathing provides a gauge of how well the patient's lungs (or lung if singular) are functioning, by indicating sustained inhalation vacuum. While the patient is holding their breath, the indicator piston will slowly return to the bottom of the column. Patient then removes the mouthpiece from their mouth and exhales normally. Coughing can be expected to clear the airway and lungs of mucus. Patients are encouraged to rest if they begin feeling dizzy.

Generally, patients are encouraged to do many repetitions a day while measuring progress by way of advancing the movable gauge along the central column of the device as they improve.

== Alternative approach for children ==
Traditional incentive spirometers can be more challenging for children due to compliance and submaximal effort. Age-appropriate devices including whistles, pinwheels, and bubble wands should be considered. These toys and activities reinforce proper breathing mechanics by stimulating deep inhalation and prolonged exhalation.

== Additional images ==
Another example of an incentive spirometer

== See also ==
- Respiratory system – Biological system in animals and plants for gas exchange
- Spirometer – Apparatus for measuring air volume inspired and expired by the lungs
