= Atelectasis =

Partial collapse of a lung causing reduced gas exchange

- Other names: Collapsed lung
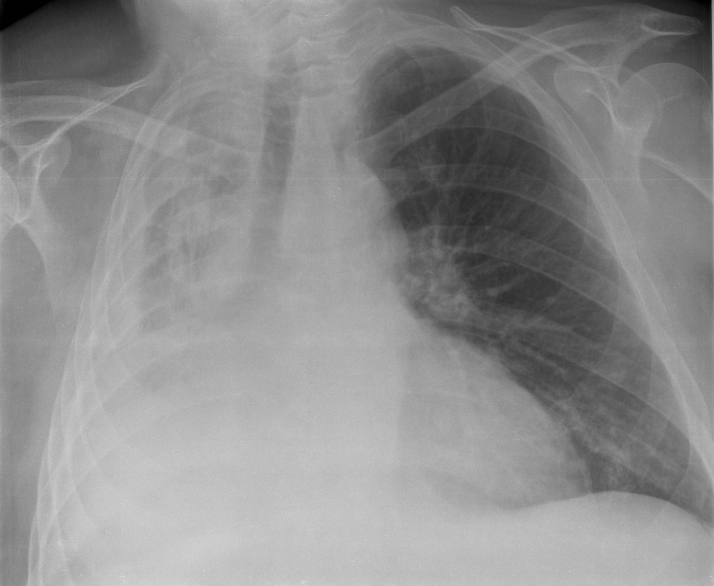
- Atelectasis of a person's right lung. The right lung is not fully filled with air, so it looks smaller and denser than the left side.
- Pronunciation: /ˌætɪˈlɛktəsɪs/
- Specialty: Pulmonology

Atelectasis is the partial or total collapse of a lung resulting in a reduced or absent exchange of gases. Specifically it is the collapse of tiny air sacs (alveoli) in the lung. It is usually unilateral, affecting part or all of one lung. It is a condition where the alveoli are deflated down to little or no volume, as distinct from pulmonary consolidation, in which they are filled with liquid. It is often referred to informally as a collapsed lung, although it usually involves only a partial collapse. A fully collapsed lung is caused by a pneumothorax.

Atelectasis is a very common finding in chest X-rays , and may be caused by a number of medical conditions, or just by normal exhalation. Acute atelectasis may occur as a post-operative complication or as a result of surfactant deficiency. In premature babies, this leads to infant respiratory distress syndrome.

The term uses combining forms of atel- + ectasis, from Greek: ἀτελής, "incomplete" + Greek: ἔκτασις, "extension".

== Signs and symptoms ==
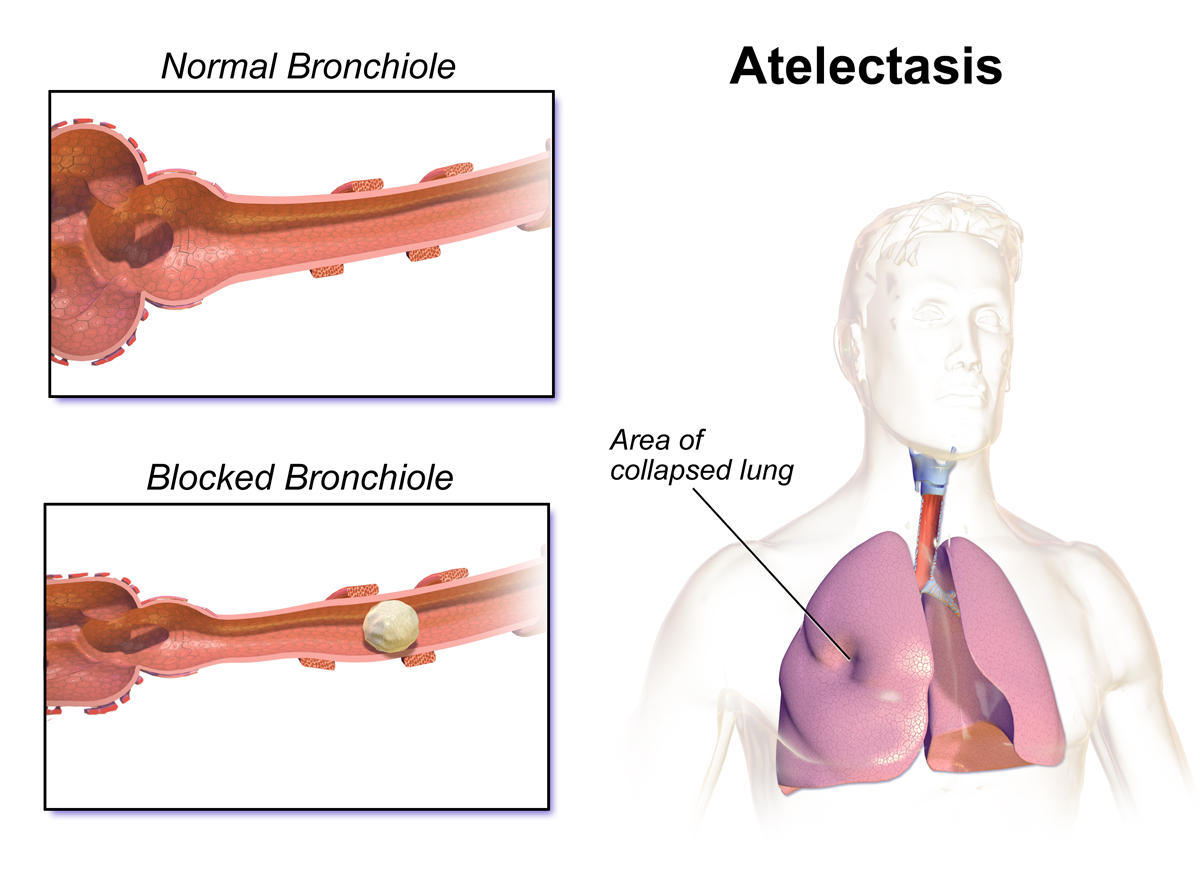
Comparing normal, fully expanded lung(top) vs. atelectasis(bottom).

May have no signs and symptoms or they may include:

- cough, but not prominent;
- chest pain (not common);
- breathing difficulty (fast and shallow);
- low oxygen saturation;
- pleural effusion (transudate type);
- cyanosis (late sign);
- Stridor
- increased heart rate.

Mild atelectasis is often asymptomatic and can only be found through X-Ray, though for larger collapsed specific clinical signs include tachypnea and diminished chest expansion on affected side.

It is a common misconception and pure speculation that atelectasis causes postoperative fever. This claim has been perpetuated in medical textbooks as recently as 2021. Review articles published in 2011 and 2019 summarizing the available evidence on the association between atelectasis and post-operative fever concluded that there is no clinical evidence supporting this speculation. A recent article outlined the history of this myth and the true causes of postoperative fever.

== Causes ==
The most common cause is post-surgical atelectasis, characterized by splinting, i.e. restricted breathing after abdominal surgery. Atelectasis develops in 75–90% of people undergoing general anesthesia for a surgical procedure.

A common cause for atelectasis is tuberculosis. Tobacco smokers, and the elderly are also at an increased risk. Outside of this context, atelectasis implies some blockage of a bronchiole or bronchus, which can be within the airway (foreign body, mucus plug), from the wall (tumor, usually squamous cell carcinoma) or compressing from the outside (tumor, lymph node, tubercle). Another cause is poor surfactant spreading during inspiration, causing the surface tension to be at its highest which tends to collapse smaller alveoli. Atelectasis may also occur during suction, as along with sputum, air is withdrawn from the lungs. There are several types of atelectasis according to their underlying mechanisms or the distribution of alveolar collapse; resorption, compression, microatelectasis and contraction atelectasis. Relaxation atelectasis (also called passive atelectasis) is when a pleural effusion or a pneumothorax disrupts the contact between the parietal and visceral pleurae.

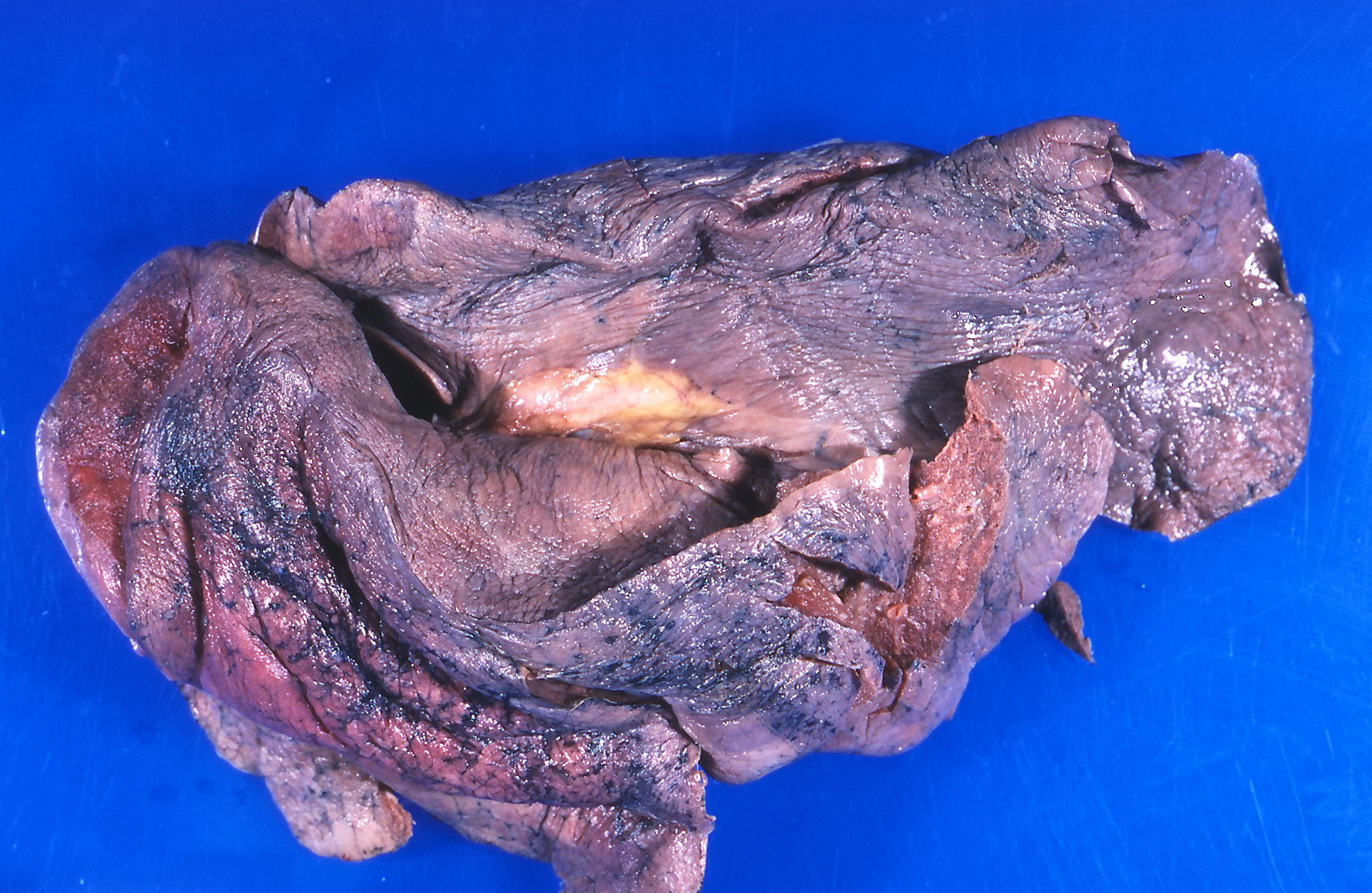
Pathology of a human lung with atelectasis also associated with obstructive pneumonia. In the image the collapsed area appears darker than healthy lung tissue.

Risk factors associated with increased likelihood of the development of atelectasis include: the type of surgery (thoracic and cardiopulmonary surgeries), the use of muscle relaxants, obesity, high oxygen, the lower lung segments.

Factors also associated with the development of atelectasis include: age, presence of chronic obstructive pulmonary disease or asthma, and type of anesthetic.

In the early 1950s, in UK aviation medicine, the condition acceleration atelectasis was given the name "Hunter lung" due to its prevalence in pilots of the transonic fighter jet, the Hawker Hunter, which used a 100% oxygen supply.

== Diagnosis ==
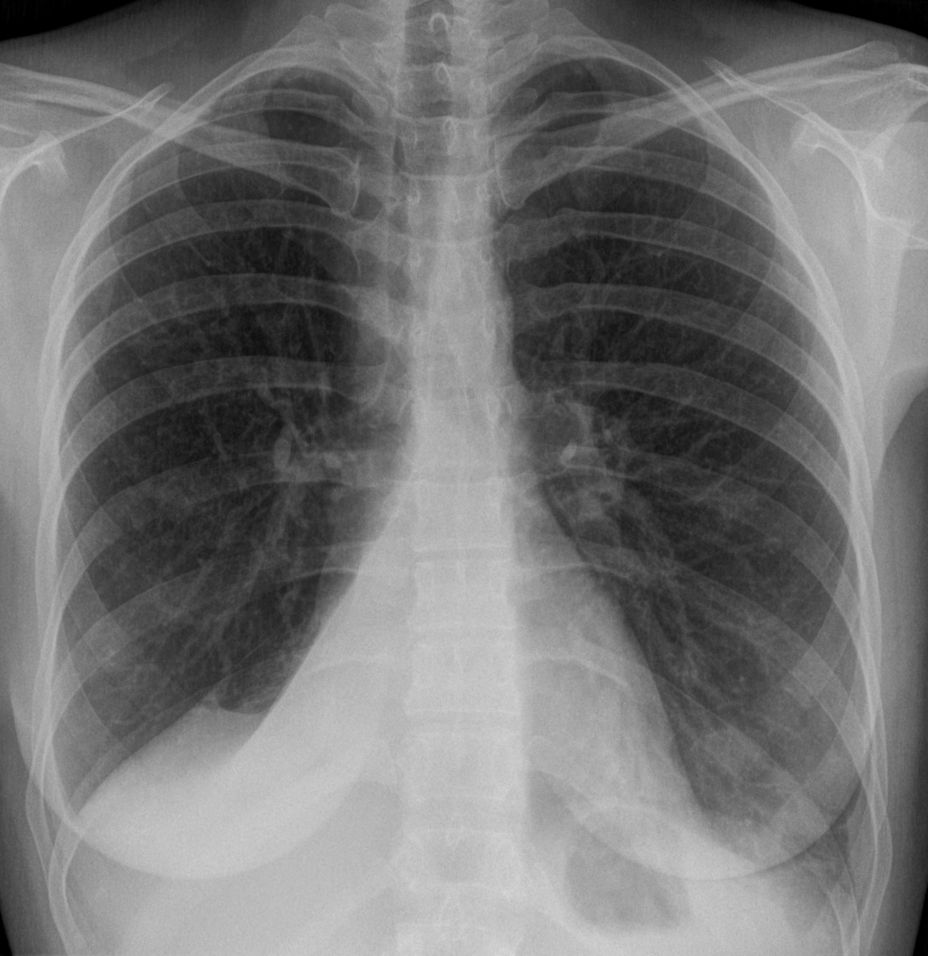
Atelectasis of the right lower lobe seen on chest X-ray.

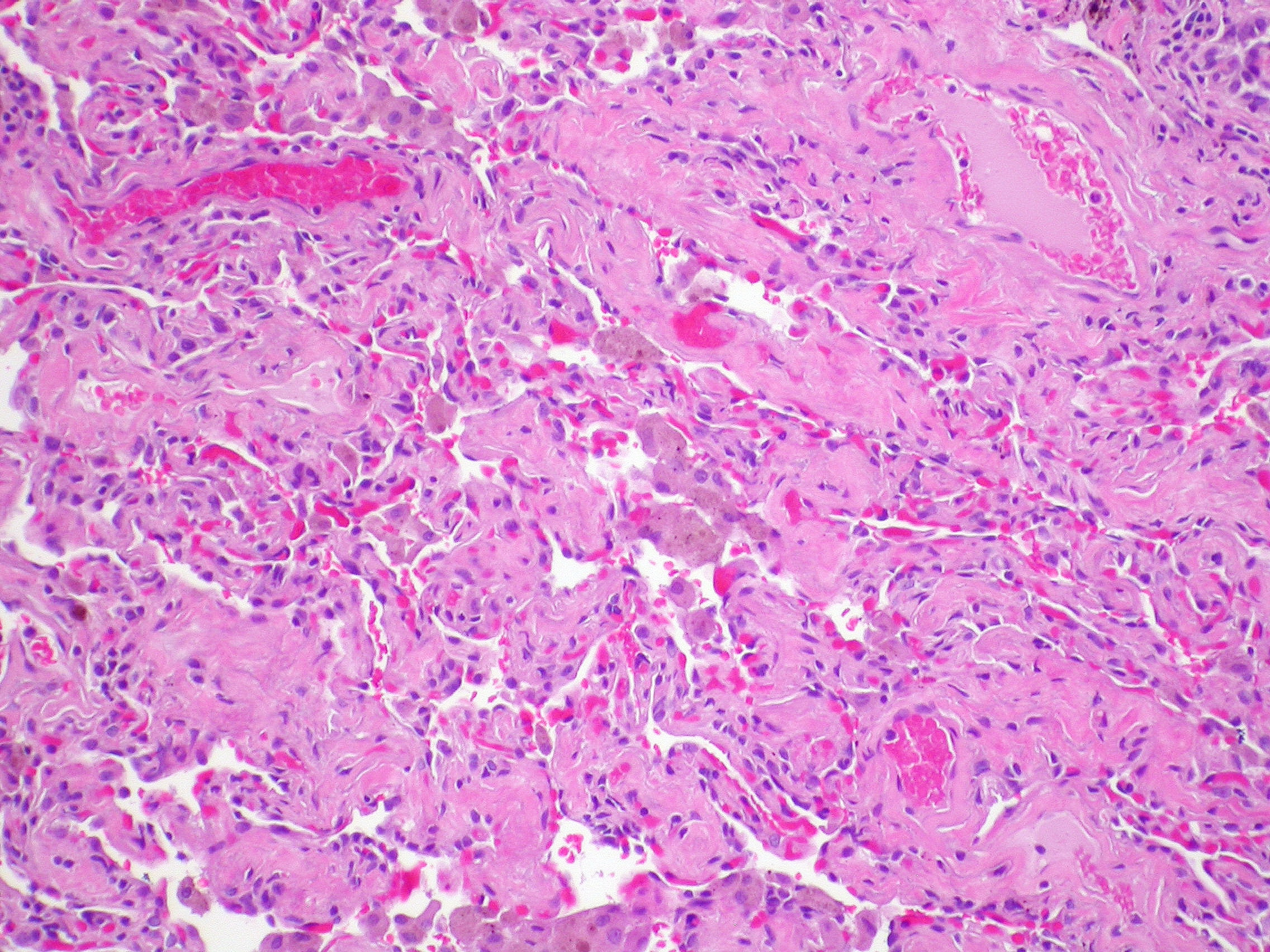
Microscopic image showing atelectasis and thickened alveolar walls, leading to reduced space for gas exchange.

Clinically significant atelectasis is generally visible on chest X-ray; findings can include lung opacification and/or loss of lung volume. Post-surgical atelectasis will be bibasal in pattern. Chest CT or bronchoscopy may be necessary if the cause of atelectasis is not clinically apparent. Direct signs of atelectasis include displacement of interlobar fissures and mobile structures within the thorax, overinflation of the unaffected ipsilateral lobe or contralateral lung, and opacification of the collapsed lobe. Primarily, in a lung ultrasound the static air bronchogram is the what differentiates atelectasis from pneumonia. In addition to clinically significant findings on chest X-rays, patients may present with indirect signs and symptoms such as elevation of the diaphragm, shifting of the trachea, heart and mediastinum; displacement of the hilus and shifting granulomas.

=== Classification ===
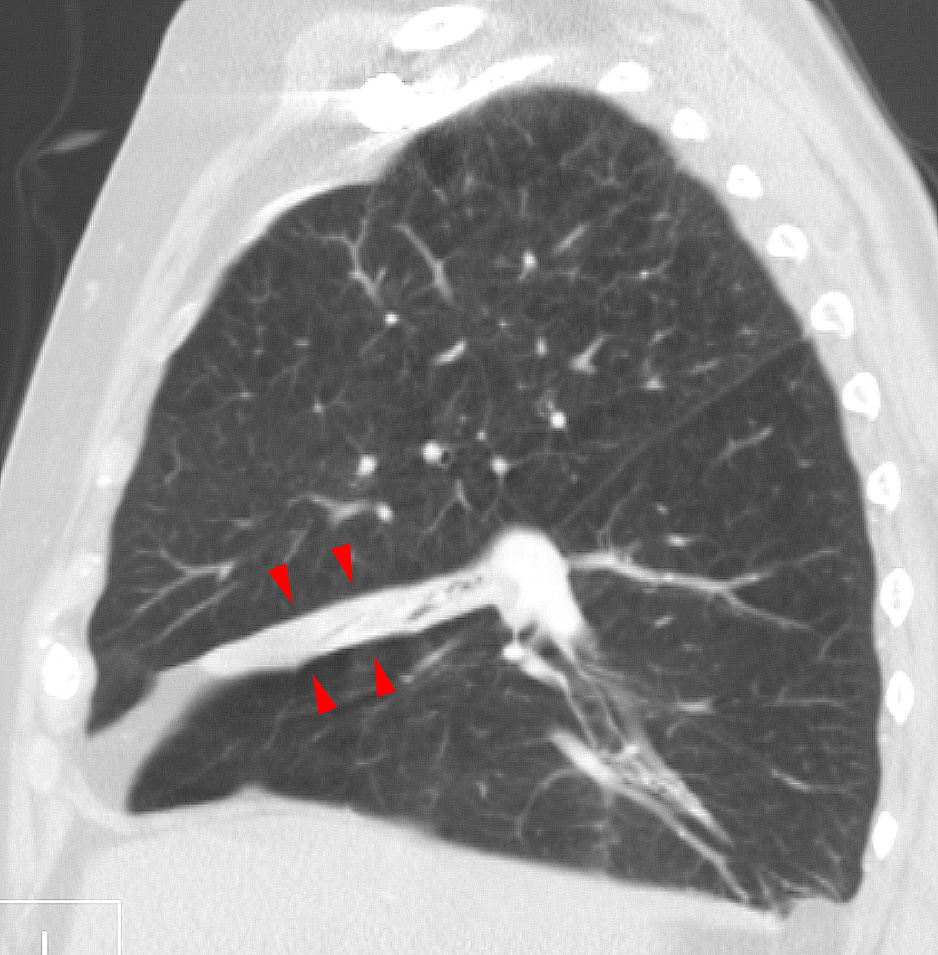
Atelectasis of the middle lobe on a sagittal CT reconstruction.

Atelectasis is broadly categorized into obstructive (resorptive) and non-obstructive types. It may be further classified as an acute or chronic condition. In acute atelectasis, the lung has recently collapsed and is primarily notable only for airlessness. In chronic atelectasis, the affected area is often characterized by a complex mixture of airlessness, infection, widening of the bronchi (bronchiectasis), destruction, and scarring (fibrosis).

==== Resorptive atelectasis ====
Resorptive or obstructive atelectasis is defined by blockage of the airway with air trapping and subsequent absorption of air distal to the obstruction. The resulting absorption of air distal to the obstruction results in collapse of the alveoli. It is most commonly due to intrathoracic tumors, aspiration of a foreign body, or mucus plugs. Children are notably more susceptible to atelectasis due to poorly developed collateral airways, which protect against alveolar collapse by maintaining inflation. The Earth's atmosphere is mainly composed of 78% nitrogen and 21% oxygen (+ 1% argon and traces of other gases). Since oxygen is exchanged at the alveoli-capillary membrane, nitrogen is a major component for the alveoli's state of inflation. If a large volume of nitrogen in the lungs is replaced with oxygen, the oxygen may subsequently be absorbed into the blood, reducing the volume of the alveoli, resulting in a form of alveolar collapse known as absorption atelectasis.

==== Adhesive atelectasis ====
This type of atelectasis is due to lack or dysfunction of surfactant, which normally functions to reduce alveolar surface tension. The increased surface tension in the alveoli then results in alveolar instability and collapse. It is most commonly seen in infant respiratory distress syndrome and acute respiratory distress syndrome (ARDS).

==== Compressive atelectasis ====
This type occurs when the extra-alveolar pressure overcomes the intra-alveolar pressure, which results in collapse of the lung tissue. While the cause may vary, it is classically associated with the accumulation of blood, fluid, or air within the pleural cavity. These accumulations result in an increase in extra-alveolar pressure which leads to a pressure gradient favoring collapse of the alveoli. This is a frequent occurrence with pleural effusions secondary to congestive heart failure (CHF). Leakage of air into the pleural cavity (pneumothorax) may also lead to compressive atelectasis.

==== Relaxation atelectasis ====
This type of atelectasis occurs when there is loss of contact of the lung to the chest wall. It classically occurs as a result of a pleural effusion or pneumothorax. While relaxation and compressive atelectasis share a lot in common, compressive atelectasis tends to be more focal or localized.

==== Replacement atelectasis ====
This type of atelectasis occurs when alveoli of an entire lobe of the lung are filled by a tumor, typically bronchioloalveolar carcinoma. The filling of the alveoli results in a loss of lung volume.

==== Cicatrization atelectasis ====
Cicatrization atelectasis occurs when there is contraction of the lung tissue due to the presence of scar tissue. The local or generalized fibrotic changes in the lung or pleura decrease expansion of the lung and increase elastic recoil during expiration. Causes include granulomatous disease (e.g., sarcoidosis), necrotizing pneumonia and radiation pneumonitis.

=== Special cases ===
==== Right middle lobe syndrome ====
In right middle lobe syndrome, the middle lobe of the right lung contracts due to pressure on the bronchus. This many be secondary to an enlarged lymph node or occasionally a tumor. The blocked, contracted lung may develop pneumonia that fails to resolve completely and leads to chronic inflammation, scarring, and bronchiectasis. Right middle lobe syndrome may occasionally occur in the absence of obvious obstruction. It is hypothesized that the etiology of non-obstructive right middle lobe syndrome is transient hypoventilation secondary to chronic or acute inflammation.

==== Rounded atelectasis ====
Rounded atelectasis (folded lung or Blesovsky syndrome) is often mistaken for lung cancer on imaging. The most common current theory for rounded atelectasis is that local pleural irritation leads to thickening and shrinkage of the pleura which causes the adjacent lung to shrink with it. The outer portion of the lung slowly collapses as a result of scarring and shrinkage of the membrane layers covering the lungs (pleura), which would show as visceral pleural thickening and entrapment of lung tissue. This produces a rounded appearance on X-ray that doctors may mistake for a tumor. Rounded atelectasis is usually a complication of asbestos-induced disease of the pleura, but it may also result from other types of chronic scarring and thickening of the pleura.

== Treatment ==
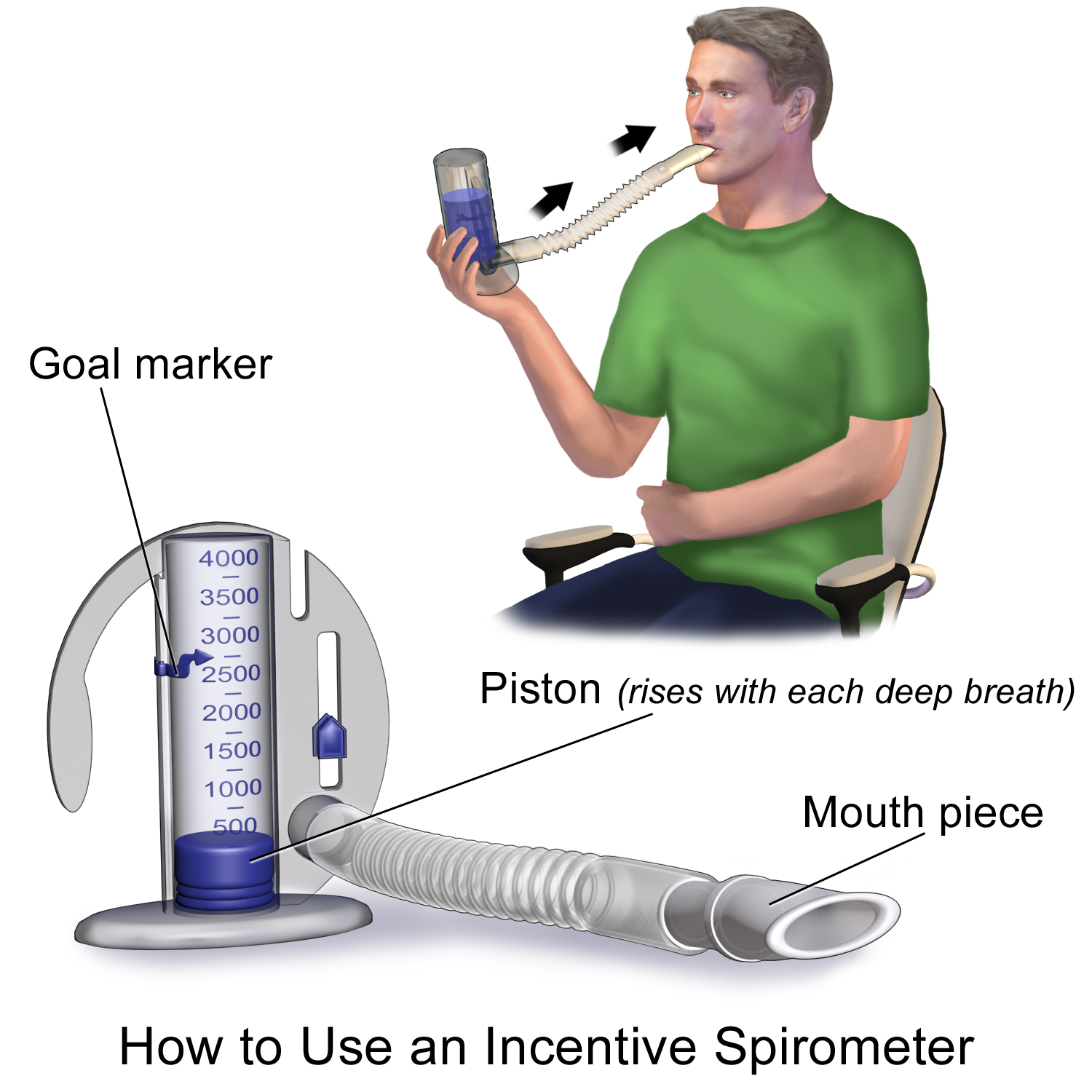
Diagram explaining how to use an incentive spirometer

Treatment is directed at the underlying cause. Atelectasis manifestations that result from the mucus plugging of the airways as seen in cystic fibrosis and pneumonia, mucoactive agents such as acetylcysteine (NAC) is used. This nebulized treatment works by reducing mucous viscosity and elasticity by breaking disulfide bonds in mucoproteins within the mucus complex, thus facilitating mucus clearance. Post-surgical atelectasis is treated by physiotherapy, focusing on deep breathing and encouraging coughing. An incentive spirometer is often used as part of the breathing exercises. Walking is also highly encouraged to improve lung inflation. People with chest deformities or neurologic conditions that cause shallow breathing for long periods may benefit from mechanical devices that assist their breathing.

The primary treatment for acute massive atelectasis is correction of the underlying cause. A blockage that cannot be removed by coughing or by suctioning the airways often can be removed by bronchoscopy. Antibiotics are given for an infection. Chronic atelectasis is often treated with antibiotics because infection is almost inevitable. In certain cases, the affected part of the lung may be surgically removed when recurring or chronic infections become disabling or bleeding is significant. If a tumor is blocking the airway, relieving the obstruction by surgery, radiation therapy, chemotherapy, or laser therapy may prevent atelectasis from progressing and recurrent obstructive pneumonia from developing.

== Prevention ==
- Post-Operative Movement.
- Deep breathing exercises
  Deep Breathing Exercises.
- Avoid Smoking 6-8 Weeks Pre-Surgery.
- Chest Physiotherapy (ie. Postural Drainage, Chest Percussion).

== Prognosis ==
Prognosis for atelectasis is typically excellent when condition is treated early-on and effectively. Most cases occurring during general anesthesia are resolved spontaneously within the first 24 hours of surgery. If left untreated persistent atelectasis may lead to significant complications such as pneumonia, hypoxemia and in severe cases, respiratory failure.

== Research ==
Recent clinical research has focused on new intraoperative ventilation strategies to reduce postoperative complications. A randomized controlled trial by Wei et al. in 2025 evaluated how individualized FiO2 filtration guided by SpO2 levels lowered the risk of postoperative atelectasis. The study suggests that avoiding too much oxygen during the surgery can help keep lungs open and lower risk of further damage.

Clinical trials have also explored other more efficient strategies in preventing and/or treating atelectasis. Open-lung ventilation potentially reduces post-operative atelectasis. Comparative studies between PCV-VG and VCV ventilation modes, explored the different ventilation modes' affect development or prevention in patients being treated surgically. Mostly testing the pressure-controlled volume-guaranteed(PCV-VG) as opposed too volume-controlled ventilation(VCV). The trials have been completed. Additional research examined how ultra-sound guided lung recruitment may affect atelectasis outcomes. In this trial an ultrasound would be used to reopen collapsed areas in the lung and reduce postoperative atelectasis altogether.

== See also ==
- Alveolar capillary dysplasia, a very rare type of diffuse congenital disorder of the lung
- Flat-chested kitten syndrome or FCKS: atelectasis in neo-natal kittens
- Tympanic membrane atelectasis: Retraction of the ear drum into the middle ear can also be referred to as atelectasis.
- William Pasteur, pioneer pulmonologist
