= Rapid CRP =

Rapid CRP may refer to:

- A quick test of C-reactive protein
- Procalcitonin, also a marker of inflammation, and its rise can be detected sooner after onset
