= Mediastinal shift =

Medical condition of the chest cavity

- Left tension pneumothorax with a large, well-demarcated area devoid of lung markings with tracheal deviation and movement of the heart away from the affected side.

Mediastinal shift is an abnormal movement of the mediastinal structures toward one side of the chest cavity. A shift indicates a severe imbalance of pressures inside the chest. Mediastinal shifts are generally caused by increased lung volume, decreased lung volume, or abnormalities in the pleural space. Additionally, masses inside the mediastinum or musculoskeletal abnormalities can also lead to abnormal mediastinal arrangement. Typically, these shifts are observed on x-ray but also on computed tomography (CT) or magnetic resonance imaging (MRI). On chest x-ray, tracheal deviation, or movement of the trachea away from its midline position can be used as a sign of a shift. Other structures, like the heart, can also be used as reference points. Below are examples of pathologies that can cause a mediastinal shift and their appearance.

== Pleural space abnormalities ==
=== Tension pneumothorax ===
Tension pneumothorax is an emergent condition in which air gets trapped in the space between the chest wall and the lung. This space is referred to as the pleural space. Because air can't escape from this space, the air pocket grows larger and larger, resulting in the lung collapse closest to the pneumothorax. Forces are transmitted to the mediastinum and effectively "push" the mediastinal structures to the opposite side of the chest.

=== Pleural effusion ===
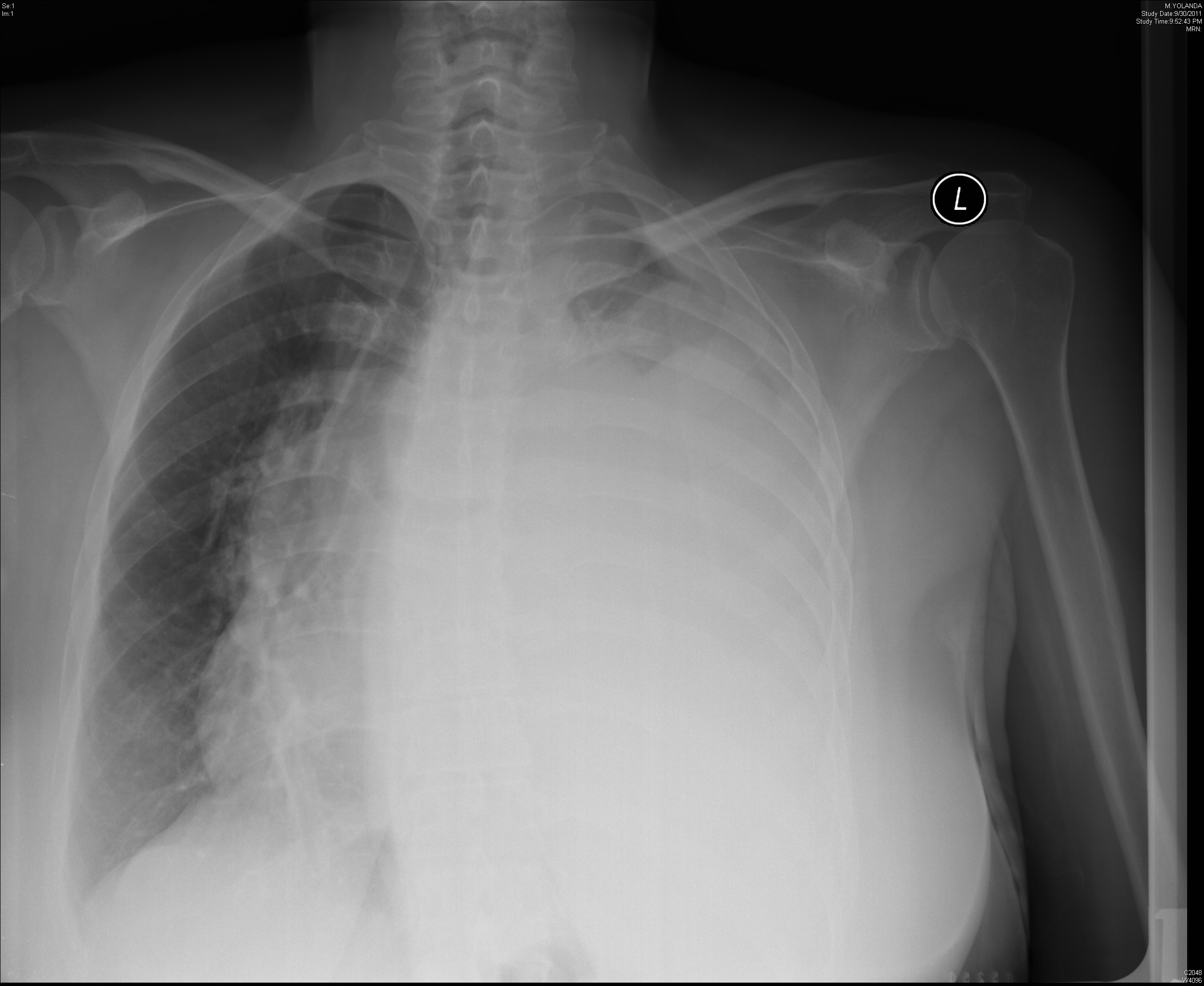
A massive left pleural effusion displacing the heart and trachea to the right

A pleural effusion is an accumulation of fluid inside the pleural space. If this collection of fluid gets large enough, it can also push structures in the chest away from it and cause a mediastinal shift. However, a pleural effusion can also pull the mediastinal structure towards itself. If this is the case, then there is an underlying condition causing the collapse of the lung on that side. An example is a tumor obstructing a bronchus and causing lung collapse and pleural effusion.

=== Hemothorax ===
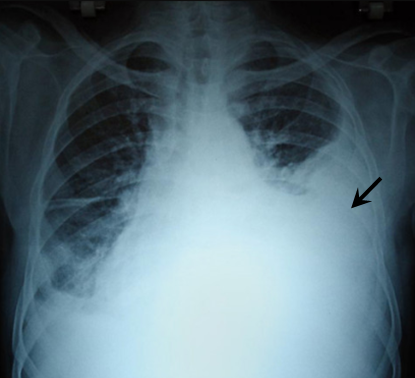
Massive right sided pleural effusion later confirmed to be a hemothorax

Hemothorax, or accumulation of blood in the pleural space, can result from trauma or surgical procedures in the chest. This accumulation of blood can grow large enough to compress the lung and push away other structures in the chest, thus causing a mediastinal shift. On a chest x-ray, a hemothorax can appear similarly to a pleural effusion with blunting of the pleural recess and white out of normal lung zones. In the setting of traumatic chest injury, rib fractures are also commonly observed on x-ray.

=== Empyema ===
Empyema progression seen on the left side of the chest over the course of 2 weeks.

An empyema is a collection of pus inside the pleural cavity. It is a complication of pneumonia or thoracic injury or surgery and also requires urgent diagnosis and treatment. Radiographic appearance is similar to that of a pleural effusion with costophrenic angle blunting and white out of lung zones. CT imaging is necessary to evaluate the structure of the empyema and evaluate for loculation or separation of the pus into different compartments. Finally, ultrasound is becoming a more commonly used imaging technique to evaluate an empyema. Ultrasound is more readily available at the bedside, is better at detecting pleural effusion, and can be used to guide thoracentesis to remove the empyema.

=== Masses ===
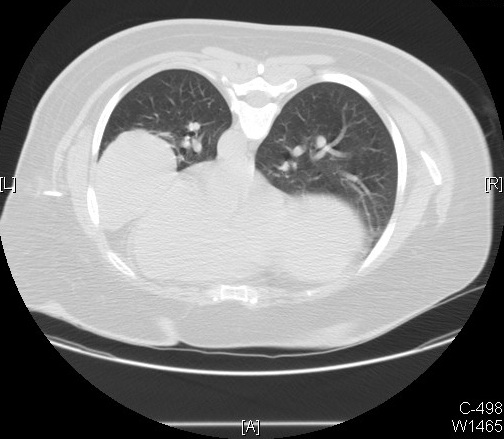
Axial CT image showing a large left sided mass that appears attached to the pleura.

Masses such as tumors can also cause compression and displacement of mediastinal structures. There are various mediastinal tumors, and they are classified by their location in the chest. Notable examples include germ cell tumors and lymphomas. Teratomas are a class of germ cell tumors that arise in the chest due to failure of germ cell migration during development. They can expand to large sizes and cause hemoptysis and pleural effusion. Radiographic features of teratomas typically include fluid and fat but also muscle, teeth, and bones inside the mass.

== Decreased lung volume ==
=== Atelectasis ===
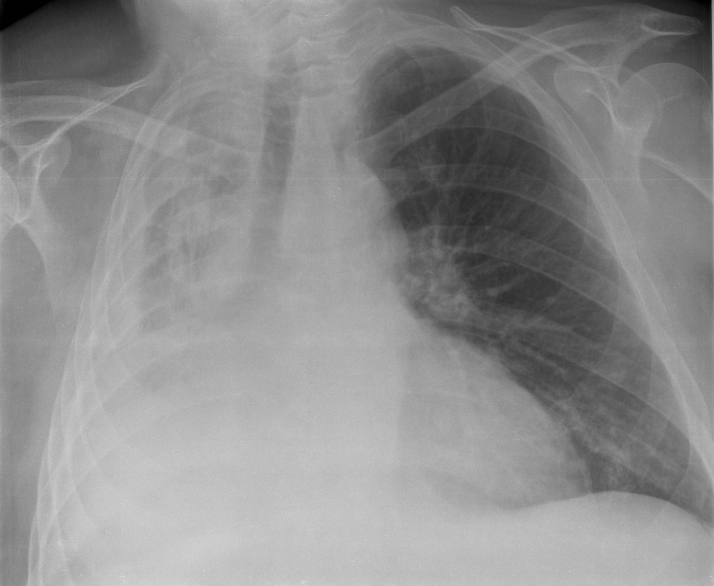
Chest x-ray demonstrating severe atelectasis or collapse of the right lung and mediastinal shift towards the right.

Atelectasis is the partial collapse of a lung that is reversible. There are numerous etiologies, including post-operative atelectasis, surfactant deficiency, mucus plugging, and foreign body aspiration. Notably, post-operative atelectasis is thought to be caused by general anesthesia administration. Collapse of the affected lung shifts mediastinal structure towards the same side and can be observed on chest x-ray or CT. Radiographic features include increased opacification of collapsed lung and/or tracheal shift.

=== Pulmonary hypoplasia ===
Fetal conditions can also cause a mediastinal shift during development. For example, pulmonary hypoplasia is the underdevelopment of a lung due to various etiologies. These include agenesis due to gene mutation, fetal hydrothorax, and congenital diaphragmatic hernia. These conditions lead to incomplete development of lung tissue or hypoplasia. This can be unilateral or bilateral and is seen on x-ray as a mediastinal shift towards the side of the underdeveloped lung. Additionally, mediastinal shifts can also be detected using antenatal ultrasonography.

=== Pectus excavatum ===
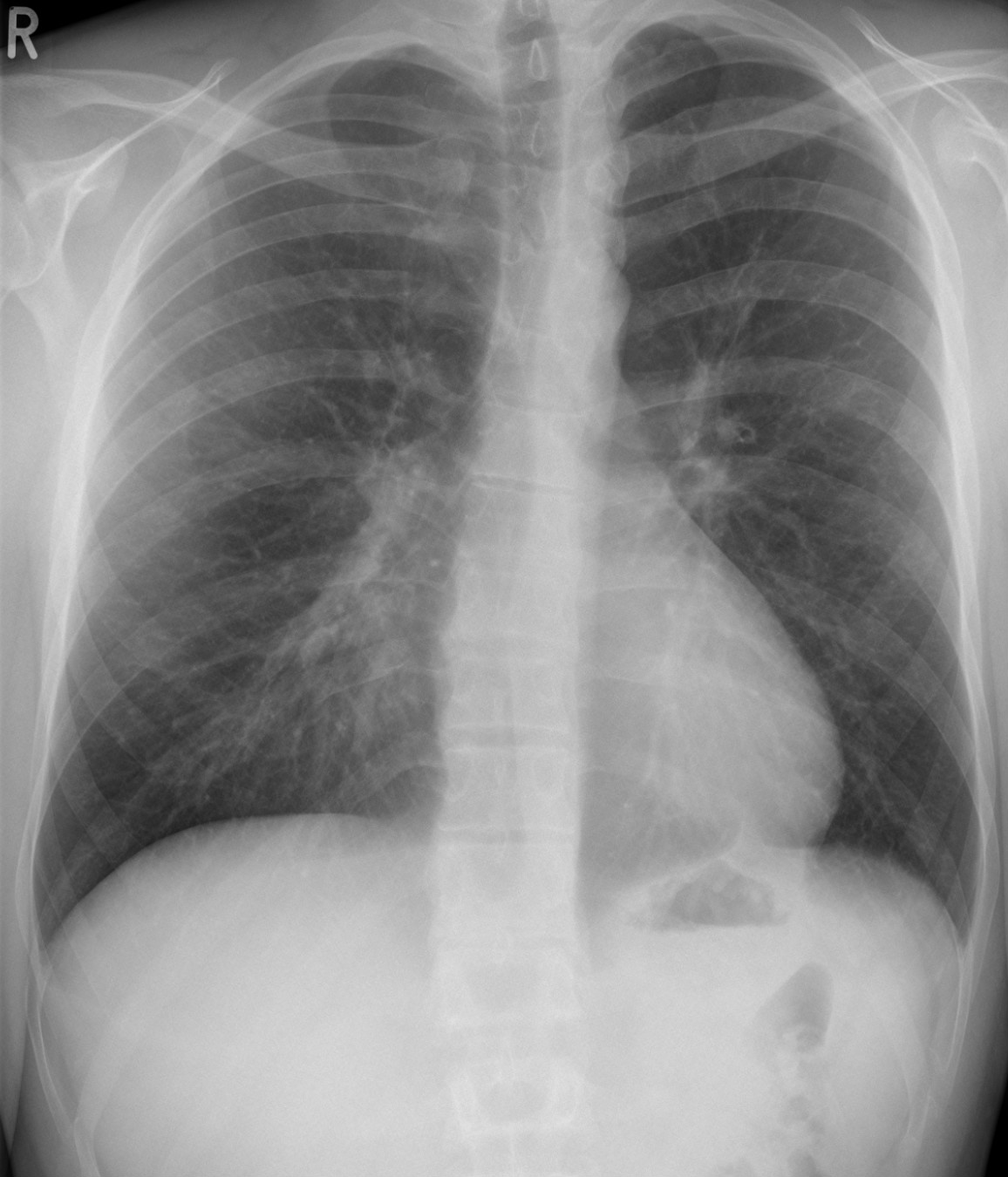
Chest x-ray showing pectus excavatum with leftward shift of heart shadow.

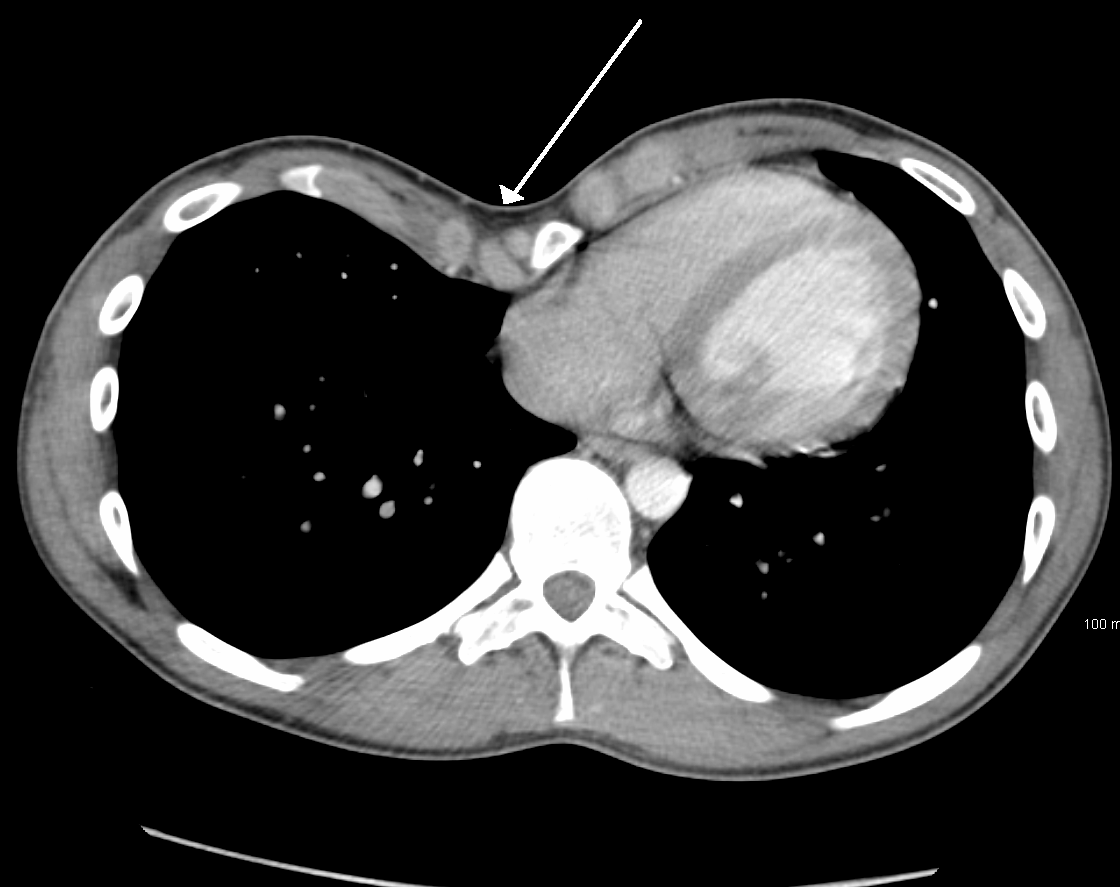
CT axial view showing pectus excavatum of the chest.

This condition is often called "funnel chest" and is observed as depression of the anterior chest at the xiphisternum. Pectus excavatum is commonly unilateral and, therefore, can lead to asymmetric distribution of thoracic organs. Therefore, a mediastinal shift can be seen in severe cases. Radiographic features include a leftward deviation of the heart and deformed third to seventh ribs. Patients often present with exercise tolerance, cardiac arrhythmias, and heart murmur.

=== Post-operative changes ===
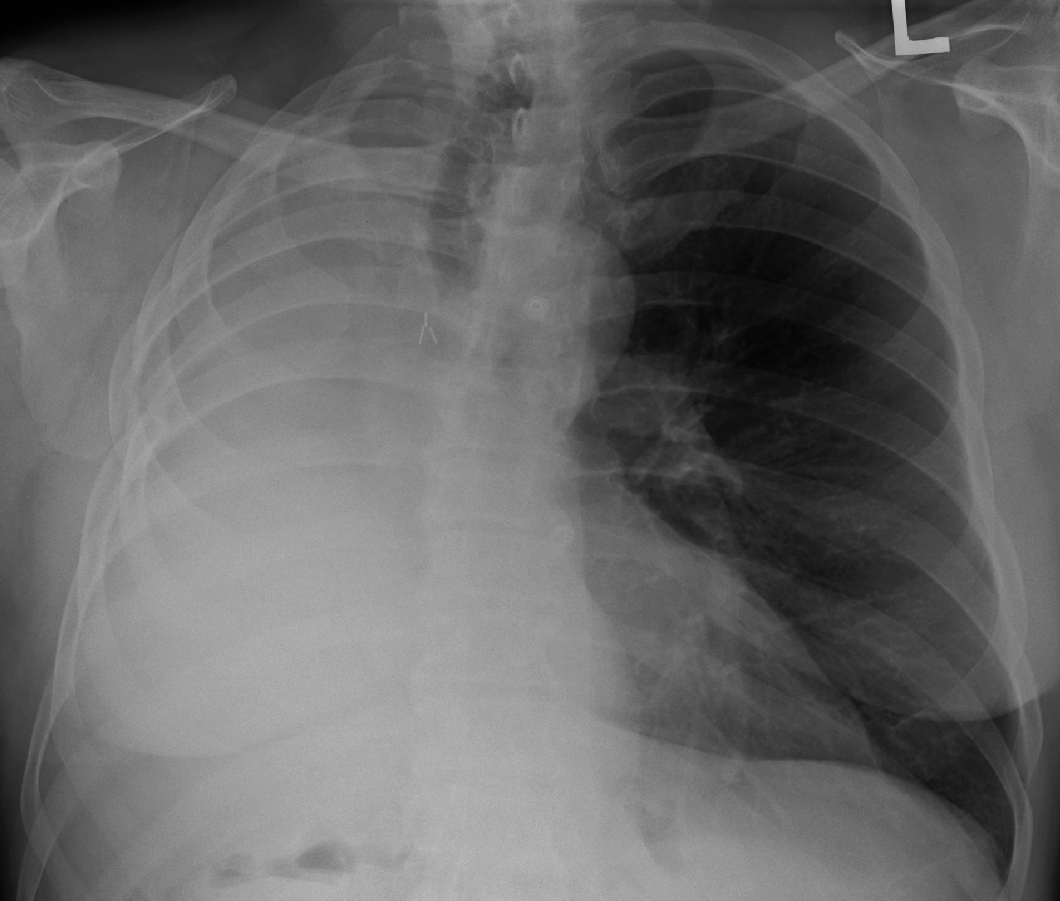
Chest x-ray showing an individual who had their right lung removed with fluid accumulating in the operated side.

A pneumonectomy is a surgical procedure in which an entire lung is removed. A common reason for performing this procedure is for lung cancer originating in the lung itself. This leads to a mediastinal shift towards the empty side of the thorax. Notably, patients can experience post pneumonectomy syndrome due to a severe mediastinal shift. This presents as difficulty breathing due to a shift of airways and rotation of the heart and great vessels. On x-ray, white out of the operated side and hyperinflation of the remaining lung is often observed.

== Increased lung volume ==
=== Foreign body aspiration ===
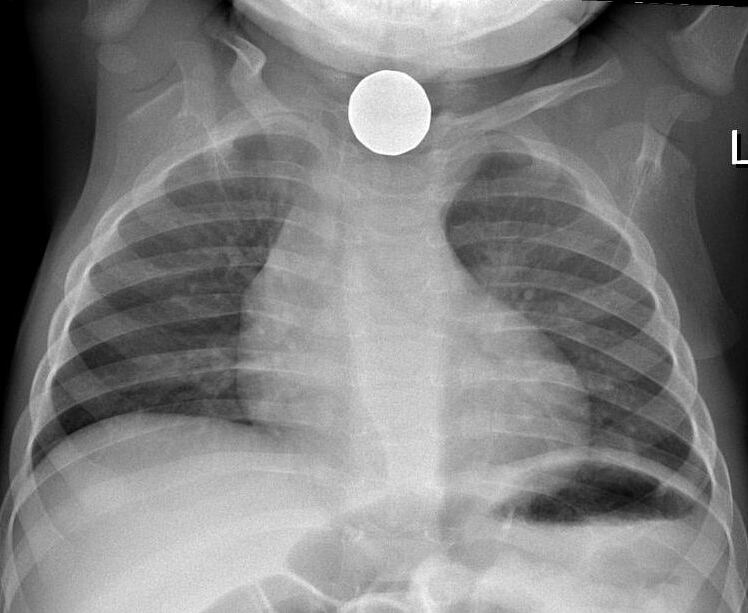
Chest x-ray in an infant showing aspiration of a metallic coin without signs of mediastinal shift.

Foreign body aspiration is a major cause of death in young children due to their underdeveloped swallowing coordination. Young children most commonly ingest toys, coins, or food. On chest x-ray, the most frequent sign is air trapping that can lead to a mediastinal shift. Atelectasis and pneumothorax may also occur in the setting of foreign body aspiration. The diagnosis is made in conjunction with clinical symptoms and confirmed and treated with bronchoscopy.

=== Asymmetric bullous emphysema ===
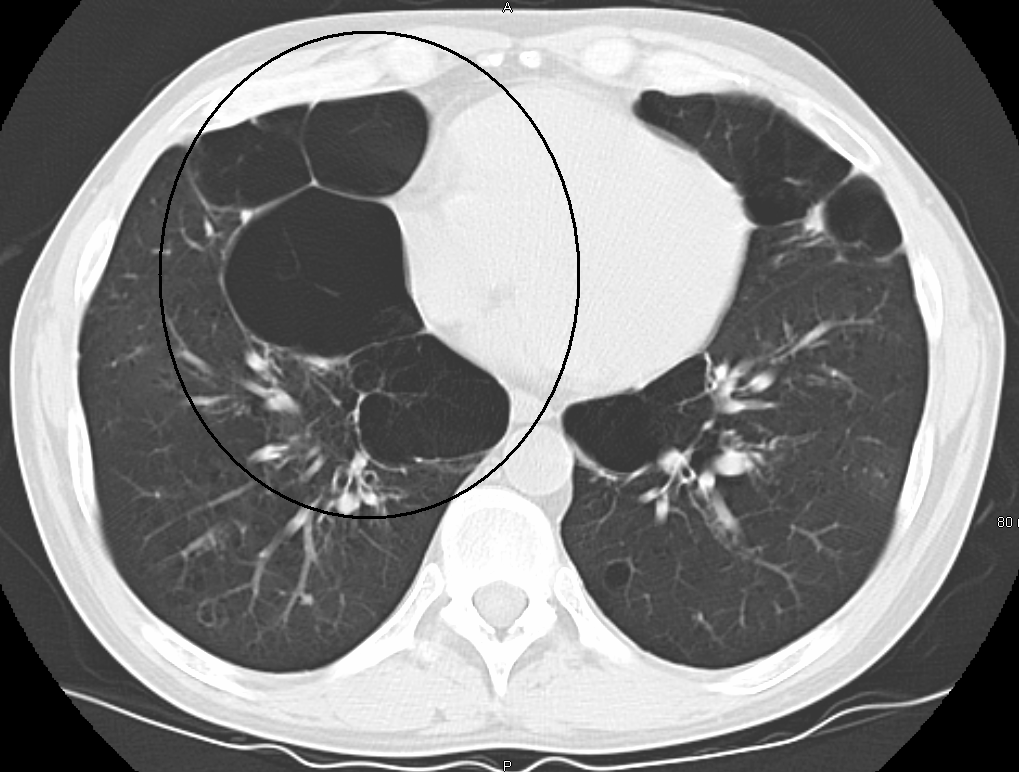
An axial CT image showing bullous emphysema of the lungs. There are larger air pockets on the right than left.

Bullous emphysema is a condition seen in patients with chronic obstructive pulmonary disease (COPD). The units making up the substructure of the lung (alveoli) become permanently enlarged due to the destruction of their walls. This leads to hyperinflation of the alveoli and, thus, the lungs. When this occurs asymmetrically, one lung can be larger than the other. A severe variant of this condition is called giant bullous emphysema. On chest x-ray, one lung will be significantly more inflated than the other, causing a mediastinal shift. Bullous emphysema's radiographic appearance on x-ray mimics a tension pneumothorax. This presents a medical challenge as these diseases are treated differently despite appearing similarly on x-ray.

=== Congenital pulmonary airway malformation ===
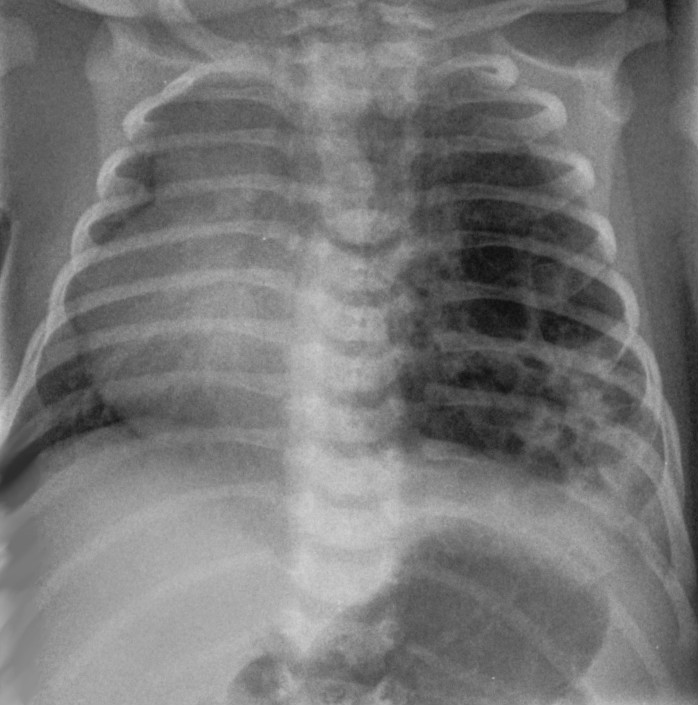
Chest x-ray of infant showing CPAM in the left lung causing a mediastinal shift towards the right. The cysts appear as bubbles in the left lung.

Congenital pulmonary airway malformation (CPAM) is a rare disease in which the lung airways develop abnormally in the fetus. This leads to infants having pockets of air and cystic masses in their lungs. These can expand in size and cause a mediastinal shift, especially in the higher grades of CPAM. Diagnosis is usually made on ultrasound and supplemented with x-ray, CT, or MRI to further define the malformation. On chest x-ray, CPAM has varying appearances but may look like "bubbles" within the lung fields.
