= Alveolar capillary dysplasia =

Rare lung disease, present at birth and treatable by lung transplants

- Other names: Alveolar capillary dysplasia with misalignment of pulmonary veins (ACDMPV)
- Symptoms: Blue lips or skin, rapid breathing
- Complications: Respiratory failure
- Usual onset: 24–48 hours after birth
- Causes: FOXF1 mutation (at least 40% of cases)
- Diagnostic method: Lung biopsy or FOXF1 genetic testing
- Differential diagnosis: Idiopathic PPHN, sepsis, pneumonia, surfactant deficiencies, hyaline membrane disease, pulmonary hypoplasia, acinar dysplasia, congenital alveolar dysplasia
- Prevention: None
- Treatment: Lung transplant
- Medication: Pulmonary vasodilators
- Prognosis: Mortality rate ~100%
- Frequency: Unknown

Alveolar capillary dysplasia (ACD) is a rare, congenital diffuse lung disease characterized by abnormal blood vessels in the lungs that cause highly elevated pulmonary blood pressure and an inability to effectively oxygenate and remove carbon dioxide from the blood. ACD typically presents in newborn babies within hours of birth as rapid and labored breathing, blue-colored lips or skin, quickly leading to respiratory failure and death. Atypical forms of ACD have been reported with initially milder symptoms and survival of many months before the onset of respiratory failure or lung transplantation.

Most cases of ACD are caused by mutations affecting the gene FOXF1 or its nearby enhancer region. Exactly how these mutations lead to abnormal lung development is unknown. Abnormal lung development is characterized by thickened alveolar interstitium, misplacement of pulmonary capillaries away from the alveolar surface, and fewer capillaries overall. This results in poor gas exchange and pulmonary hypertension. There is evidence for connections between pulmonary arteries and systemic vessels, which would additionally contribute to poor blood oxygenation.

ACD is typically diagnosed by examination of lung tissue under a microscope, either from lung biopsy or an autopsy. The characteristic findings of misplaced pulmonary veins adjacent to pulmonary arteries, and abnormal alveolar and capillary development confirm the diagnosis. FOXF1 genetic testing is also available, which can confirm the diagnosis without invasive testing. There are no effective treatments for severe ACD. Standard therapy, which includes mechanical ventilation, pulmonary vasodilators, and possibly ECMO, provide only temporary improvement in symptoms with disease progression returning within hours. For babies with atypical ACD, response to medical therapy is more sustained, lasting for several months. For those that can be stabilized, definitive treatment is bilateral lung transplantation.

ACD is a rare disease. About 100 cases have been reported. The first case was reported in 1981.

== Signs and symptoms ==
ACD is a congenital disease whose symptoms appear within hours to days after birth. Babies with ACD usually have no symptoms at the time of birth, but soon after will begin to breathe rapidly, showing increased work of breathing, and may have blue discoloration around the lips, arms, or legs, especially when feeding or crying. If an echocardiogram is performed, marked thickening of the right ventricle will be seen, resulting from highly elevated pulmonary blood pressure. ACD is generally resistant to treatment. Babies who have persistent symptoms that are poorly relieved by standard therapies for neonatal pulmonary hypertension is commonly observed in ACD.

Atypical forms of ACD have been reported with only mildly rapid breathing shortly after birth. They may present with the above symptoms of ACD at several months of age. Their symptoms may improve with standard pulmonary hypertension therapies for weeks to months before symptoms return.

Babies born with ACD usually have other congenital abnormalities affecting the heart, the intestines, urinary system, or genitals.

== Cause ==
Most cases of ACD are caused by deletions or point mutations involving the gene FOXF1 on chromosome 16 or an area near the FOXF1 gene that regulates its expression. ACD is an autosomal dominant disorder, meaning only one disease-causing mutation affecting FOXF1 or its regulator region is needed to cause ACD. Evidence strongly suggests that the FOXF1 regulatory region is imprinted, which might affect disease severity and may permit some to carry the disease with few or no symptoms.

== Mechanism ==
How mutations affecting FOXF1 or its regulatory region cause ACD is unknown. ACD-causing mutations result in abnormal development of lung vasculature and alveoli. In ACD, the interstitium of alveoli is thickened, with few to no capillaries located at the alveolar surface to perform gas exchange, and with lower capillary density overall. This reduction in capillaries and their misplacement away from the alveolar surface result in poor oxygenation and retention of carbon dioxide in the blood and high pulmonary blood pressure. There is also evidence of direct connections between pulmonary arteries and systemic vessels, which would deliver deoxygenated blood to the body, also contributing to low blood oxygenation.

Another characteristic histologic finding is the presence of a pulmonary vein located next to a pulmonary artery and bronchus in the same bronchovascular bundle. In a normal lung, the pulmonary vein courses with lymphatic vessels in the lung septa.

== Diagnosis ==
The gold standard for ACD diagnosis is by examination of lung tissue under a microscope. The diagnosis is made if the pathologist sees the characteristic findings of ACD: misplaced pulmonary veins adjacent to pulmonary arteries, abnormal alveoli with thickened interstitia and abnormal capillary development. Due to the rapidly progressive course of ACD, this diagnosis is frequently made during autopsy. If ACD is suspected early, examination of tissue from lung biopsy results in the quickest diagnosis. Genetic testing for FOXF1 is now available and can allow for slower but non-invasive diagnosis. As not all disease-causing mutations are known, false negatives or results of uncertain significance are possible with genetic testing.

There are no characteristic pattern of routine lab results or imaging findings that allow definitive diagnosis of ACD.

== Treatment ==
Initial treatments attempt to improve low blood oxygenation and high pulmonary blood pressures. Because blood oxygen content is usually very low, babies with ACD are often intubated, sedated, and mechanically ventilated with pure oxygen. Pulmonary vasodilators like sildenafil or inhaled nitric oxide can be used to reduce pulmonary blood pressures. For those with severe ACD, these measures offer only momentary improvement. As symptoms worsen, ECMO can be used, but it also offers only brief improvement. There are no effective treatments for severe ACD.

For infants with atypical ACD who initially had milder symptoms and present at months of life, there can be better response to therapy. There have been reports of infants with ACD surviving to 20 or 36 months without lung transplantation. Bilateral lung transplantation may be the definitive treatment.

== Epidemiology ==
ACD is a rare disease. As of 2011, about 100 cases had been reported. It is likely an under-recognized cause of death shortly after birth because diagnosis requires microscopic examination of lung tissue or specialized genetic testing, or death can be attributed to severe heart or intestinal congenital abnormalities which frequently occur in ACD.

== History ==
Congenital alveolar dysplasia was first described by MacMahon in 1948. The seminal case first describing ACD was by Janney and colleagues in 1981. Transmission from a carrier parent to a child was first reported in 1994.
