= William Pasteur =

British physician and pioneer of pulmonology

- Born: 1855
- Died: 1 September 1943 (aged 87); Tunbridge Wells
- Occupations: Physician and pulmonologist
- Known for: description and discovery of atelectasis

William Pasteur CB CMG FRCP (1855–1943) was a British physician and pioneer of pulmonology.

== Biography ==
After education at the cram school Philberds, Maidenhead, and at University College, London, William Pasteur qualified MRCS in 1880 from University College Hospital and became a house physician there. He graduated M.B. (Lond.) in 1882. After postgraduate study at Vienna clinics, he graduated MD in 1884.

He then accepted a registrar’s post at the Middlesex Hospital, which he continued to serve throughout his career as assistant physician, full physician and consulting physician, lecturer on forensic medicine, hygiene and medicine, and dean of the Medical School. Another lifelong association was with the Queen’s Hospital for Children, Hackney, which elected him as its physician and consulting physician. A fluent speaker of French and German, he was also physician to the French Hospital for some years.

He was elected FRCP in 1891. He gave the Bradshaw Lecture in 1908. On 15 May 1911 he delivered his presidential address to the Medical Society of London on post-operative lung complications. During WWI he served from 1914 to 1918, at the Rouen base with the temporary rank of Colonel, Army Medical Services, as consultant physician to the British Armies in France. His predecessor in that post was James Kingston Fowler. For his military service, Pasteur was mentioned in dispatches and was appointed CB in 1918 and CMG in 1919. WWI gave him many opportunities for studying gunshot wounds to the chest.

Thoracic disease was the main — although not the only — field of his private researches. His Bradshaw Lecture of 1908 discussed massive collapse of the lung after operation, a condition to which he referred again in an article in 1914 and one which, indeed, owed its discovery and description to Pasteur.

He was a member of the Athenaeum Club and the Alpine Club.

== Family ==
William Pasteur's parents emigrated from Switzerland to England. In 1890 William Pasteur married Violet Mabel Seddon. They had two daughters and a son. Their son, William Raymond Pasteur, was born in 1896. He became a captain in the British Army, was killed in action on 10 July 1917 in West Flanders, and was awarded the Military Cross.

== Atelectasis ==
Atelectasis (at-uh-LEK-tuh-sis) is a complete or partial collapse of the entire lung or area (lobe) of the lung. It occurs when the tiny air sacs (alveoli) within the lung become deflated or possibly filled with alveolar fluid. Atelectasis is one of the most common breathing (respiratory) complications after surgery. It's also a possible complication of other respiratory problems, including cystic fibrosis, lung tumors, chest injuries, fluid in the lung and respiratory weakness. You may develop atelectasis if you breathe in a foreign object.

The term atelectasis pulmonum was introduced in 1832 by the physician Eduard Jörg (1808–1878), whose father was Johann Christian Gottfried Jörg (1779–1856), Leipzig professor of medicine, specializing in obstetrics, gynecology, and pediatrics. Clinical interest in atelectasis was stimulated by William Pasteur's presentation in 1890.

== Selected publications ==
- with Solomon Solis-Cohen: "Spontaneous pneumothorax and pneumo-pericardium". The American Journal of the Medical Sciences. 103 (2). Philadelphia: 193–194. February 1892.
- "A case of myxoedema supervening on Graves' disease". Transactions of the Clinical Society of London. 33: 189–192. 1900.
- Pasteur, W. (1908). "Acute Anterior Poliomyelitis with Permanent Paralysis of the Diaphragm and Abdominal Muscles". Proc R Soc Med. 1(Clin Sect (Clin Sect): 51–53. doi:10.1177/003591570800100127. PMC 2046132. PMID 19972761.
- Pasteur, W. (1910). "Discussion on Pericarditis with Effusion, as determined by Operation or Post-mortem Examination". Proc R Soc Med. 3(Med Sect) (Med Sect): 82–83. doi:10.1177/003591571000300709. PMC 1961194. PMID 19974488.
- "Active lobar collapse of the lung after abdominal operation". The Lancet. 176 (4545): 1080–1083. 8 October 1910. doi:10.1016/s0140-6736(01)33673-5.
- "The Annual Oration On post-operative lung complications Delivered before the Medical Society of London on May 15th, 1911". The Lancet. 177 (4577): 1329–1334. 20 May 1911. doi:10.1016/s0140-6736(01)62679-5.
- Pasteur, W. (1913). "Massive collapse of the lung. (Syn. active lobar collapse)". British Journal of Surgery. 1 (4): 587–601. doi:10.1002/bjs.1800010407. S2CID 73395515.
