= Procalcitonin =

Precursor of the peptide hormone calcitonin

CALCA
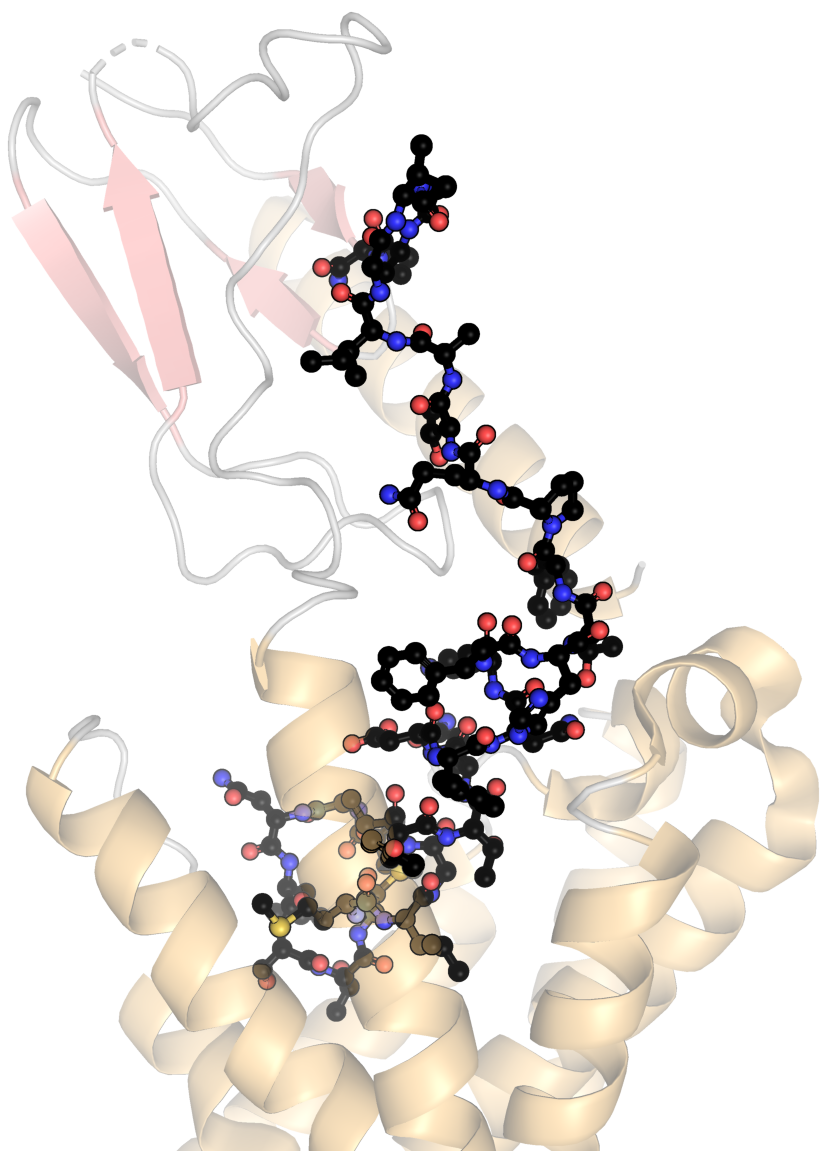

Identifiers
- Aliases: CALCA, CT, CGRP-I, CGRP-alpha, KC, PCT, calcitonin related polypeptide alpha, CGRP, CGRP1, CALC1
- External IDs: OMIM: 114130; MGI: 2151253; GeneCards: CALCA
Available structures
PDB	Ortholog search: PDBe RCSB
PDB	List of PDB id codes 2JXZ,%%s1LS7

Gene location (Human)
Chr.	Chromosome 11 (human)
Band	11p15.2	Start	14,966,668 bp
Band	11p15.2	End	14,972,351 bp

Gene location (Mouse)
Chr.	Chromosome 7 (mouse)
Band	7 F1|7 59.99 cM	Start	114,230,713 bp
Band	7 F1|7 59.99 cM	End	114,235,592 bp
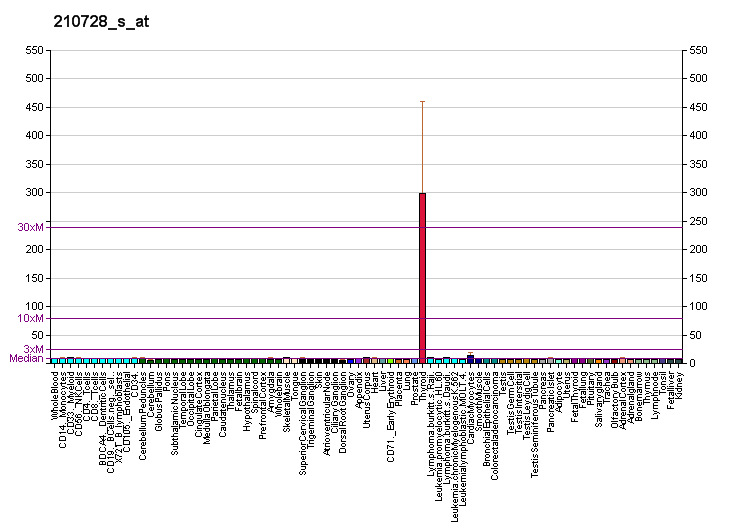

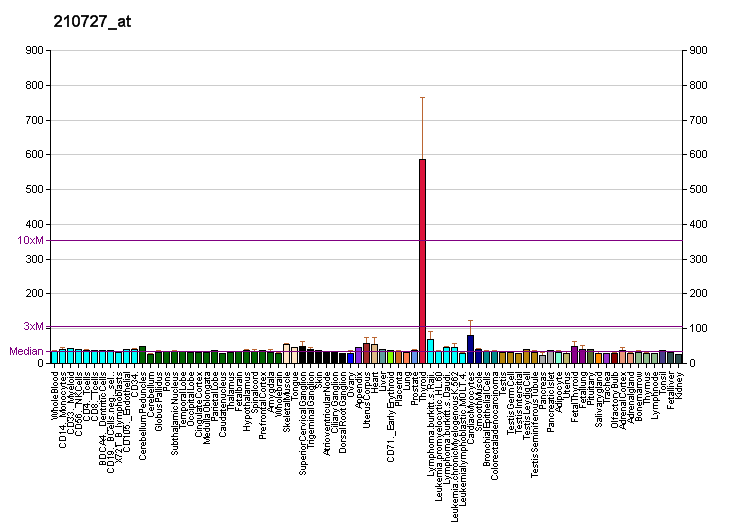

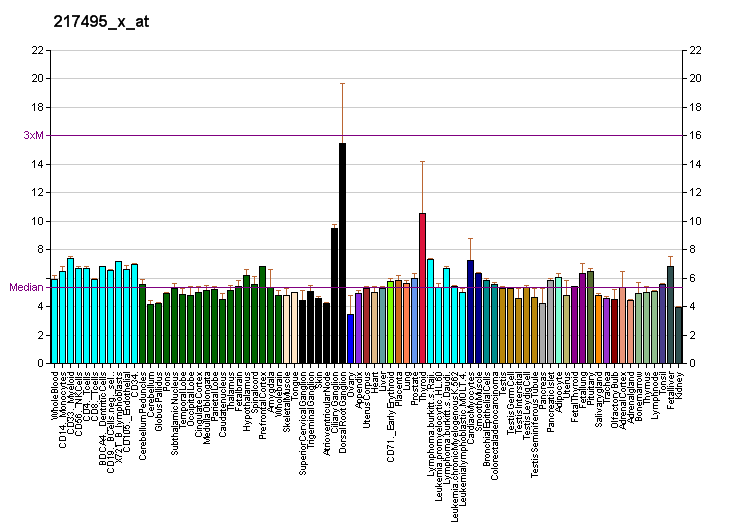
RNA expression pattern
Bgee	Human / Mouse (ortholog); Top expressed in: spinal ganglia; trigeminal ganglion; quadriceps femoris muscle; vastus lateralis muscle; cerebellar vermis; islet of Langerhans; human kidney; Epithelium of choroid plexus; tibialis anterior muscle; right lobe of liver / Top expressed in: facial motor nucleus; motor neuron; lumbar spinal ganglion; anterior horn of spinal cord; lactiferous gland; trachea; trigeminal ganglion; embryo; embryo; vestibular membrane of cochlear duct; More reference expression data
BioGPS	More reference expression data
Gene ontology
Molecular function	hormone activity; calcitonin receptor binding; protein binding; identical protein binding; signaling receptor binding; protein-containing complex binding
Cellular component	cytoplasm; intracellular anatomical structure; extracellular region; axon; terminal bouton; soma; neuron projection; nucleus; extracellular space
Biological process	cellular response to nerve growth factor stimulus; positive regulation of cytosolic calcium ion concentration involved in phospholipase C-activating G protein-coupled signaling pathway; negative regulation of smooth muscle contraction; regulation of heart contraction; monocyte chemotaxis; negative regulation of blood pressure; positive regulation of cytosolic calcium ion concentration; cellular response to tumor necrosis factor; ageing; vasodilation; cellular calcium ion homeostasis; response to heat; negative regulation of nervous system process; positive regulation of ossification; activation of adenylate cyclase activity; regulation of heart rate; detection of temperature stimulus involved in sensory perception of pain; negative regulation of ossification; response to pain; artery vasodilation involved in baroreceptor response to increased systemic arterial blood pressure; feeding behavior; inflammatory response; neuropeptide signaling pathway; negative regulation of transcription, DNA-templated; activation of protein kinase activity; embryo implantation; negative regulation of bone resorption; regulation of signaling receptor activity; G protein-coupled receptor signaling pathway; adenylate cyclase-activating G protein-coupled receptor signaling pathway; regulation of cytosolic calcium ion concentration; leukocyte cell-cell adhesion; G protein-coupled receptor internalization; positive regulation of interleukin-1 alpha production; response to yeast; negative regulation of osteoclast differentiation; cell-cell signaling; antibacterial humoral response; positive regulation of macrophage differentiation; receptor internalization; regulation of blood pressure; protein phosphorylation; vasculature development; defense response to Gram-negative bacterium; endothelial cell proliferation; positive regulation of interleukin-8 production; nervous system process involved in regulation of systemic arterial blood pressure; negative regulation of calcium ion transport into cytosol; innate immune response; endothelial cell migration; antifungal humoral response; defense response to Gram-positive bacterium; antimicrobial humoral immune response mediated by antimicrobial peptide; amylin receptor signaling pathway; calcitonin gene-related peptide receptor signaling pathway
Sources:Amigo / QuickGO
Orthologs
Databases	NCBI: entry; OMA: entry
Species	Human	Mouse
Entrez	796	12310
Ensembl	ENSG00000110680	ENSMUSG00000030669
UniProt	P01258; P06881	P70160; Q99JA0
RefSeq (mRNA)	NM_001033952; NM_001033953; NM_001741; NM_001378949; NM_001378950	NM_001033954; NM_007587; NM_001289444; NM_001305616
RefSeq (protein)	NP_001029125.1	NP_001029126; NP_001276373; NP_001292545; NP_031613; NP_001029126.1 NP_001276373.1
Location (UCSC)	Chr 11: 14.97 – 14.97 Mb	Chr 7: 114.23 – 114.24 Mb
PubMed search
- Wikidata
View/Edit Human	View/Edit Mouse

Procalcitonin (PCT) is a precursor of the peptide hormone calcitonin (which regulates blood calcium levels). It is notable for being measured in medicine as part of diagnosing diseases (see § Diagnostic advantages).

Procalcitonin arises once preprocalcitonin is cleaved by an endopeptidase. It was first identified by Leonard J. Deftos and Bernard A. Roos in the 1970s. It is composed of 116 amino acids and is produced by parafollicular cells (C cells) of the thyroid and by the neuroendocrine cells of the lung and the intestine.

The level of procalcitonin in the blood stream of healthy individuals is below the limit of detection (0.01 μg/L) of clinical assays. The level of procalcitonin rises in a response to a pro-inflammatory stimulus, especially of bacterial origin. It is therefore often classed as an acute phase reactant. The induction period for procalcitonin ranges from 4–12 hours with a half-life spanning anywhere from 22–35 hours. It does not rise significantly with viral or non-infectious inflammations. In the case of viral infections this is due to the fact that one of the cellular responses to a viral infection is to produce interferon gamma, which also inhibits the initial formation of procalcitonin. With the inflammatory cascade and systemic response that a severe infection brings, the blood levels of procalcitonin may rise multiple orders of magnitude with higher values correlating with more severe disease. However, the high procalcitonin levels produced during infections are not followed by a parallel increase in calcitonin or a decrease in serum calcium levels.

== Biochemistry ==
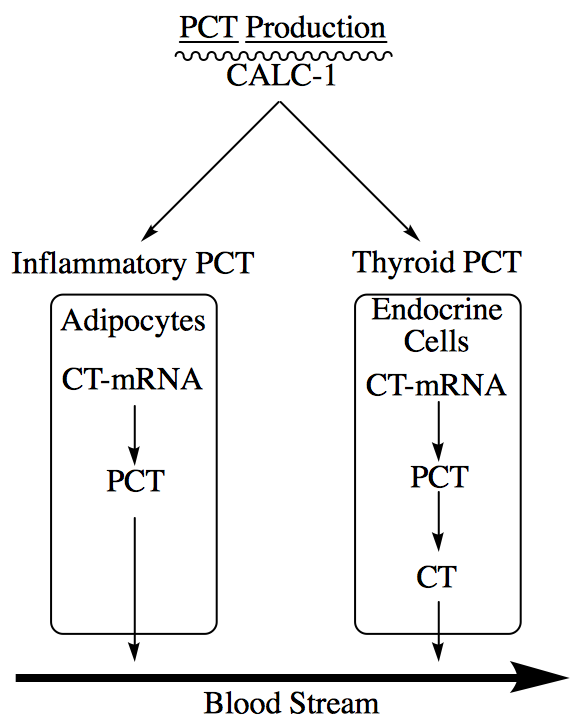
Figure 2: Production pathway of PCT and CT in healthy and infected individuals via the induction of CALC-1 gene

PCT is a member of the calcitonin (CT) superfamily of peptides. It is a peptide of 116 amino acids with an approximate molecular weight of 14.5 kDa, and its structure can be divided into three sections (see Figure 1): amino terminus (represented by the ball and stick model in Figure 1), immature calcitonin (shown in Figure 1 from PDB as the crystal structure of procalcitonin is not yet available), and calcitonin carboxyl-terminus peptide 1. Under normal physiological conditions, active CT is produced and secreted in the C-cells of the thyroid gland after proteolytic cleavage of PCT, meaning, in a healthy individual, that PCT levels in circulation are very low (<.05 ng/mL). The pathway for production of PCT under normal and inflammatory conditions are shown in Figure 2. During inflammation, LPS, microbial toxin, and inflammatory mediators, such as IL-6 or TNF-α, induce the CALC-1 gene in adipocytes, but PCT never gets cleaved to produce CT. In a healthy individual, PCT in endocrine cells is produced by CALC-1 by elevated calcium levels, glucocorticoids, CGRP, glucagon, or gastrin, and is cleaved to form CT, which is released to the blood.

PCT is located on the CALC-1 gene on chromosome 11. Bacterial infections induce a universal increase in the CALC-1 gene expression and a release of PCT (>1 μg/mL). Expression of this hormone occurs in a site specific manner. In healthy and non-infected individuals, transcription of PCT only occurs in neuroendocrine tissue, except for the C cells in the thyroid. The formed PCT then undergoes post-translational modifications, resulting in the production small peptides and mature CT by removal of the C-terminal glycine from the immature CT by peptidylglycine α-amidating monooxygenase (PAM). In a microbial infected individual, non-neuroendocrine tissue also secretes PCT by expression of CALC-1. A microbial infection induces a substantial increase in the expression of CALC-1, leading to the production of PCT in all differentiated cell types. The function of PCT synthesized in nonneuroendocrine tissue due to a microbial infection is currently unknown, but its detection aids in the differentiation of inflammatory processes.

== Diagnostic advantages ==
Due to PCT's variance between microbial infections and healthy individuals, procalcitonin has become a marker to improve identification of bacterial infection and guide antibiotic therapy. The table below is a summary from Schuetz, Albrich, and Mueller, summarizing the current data of selected, relevant studies investigating PCT in different types of infections.

Legend:
✓ = Moderate evidence in favor of PCT
✓✓ = Good evidence in favor of PCT
✓✓✓ = Strong evidence in favor of PCT
~ = Evidence in favor or against the use of PCT, or still undefined

Infection Type/Setting	Study Design	PCT Cut-Off (ug/L)	PCT Benefit	Conclusion	References
Abdominal Infections	observational	0.25	~	PCT may help exclude ischemia and necrosis in bowel blockage	
Arthritis	observational	0.1-0.25	✓	PCT differentiates non-infectious (gout) arthritis from true infection	
Bacteremic infections	observational	0.25	✓✓	Low PCT levels help rule out microbial infections	
Blood stream infection (primary)	observational	0.1	✓✓	PCT differentiates contamination from true infection	
Bronchitis	RCT	0.1-0. 5	✓✓✓	PCT reduces antibiotic exposure without adverse outcomes in the ED	
COPD exacerbation	RCT	0.1-0. 5	✓✓✓	PCT reduces antibiotic exposure without adverse outcomes in the ED and hospital	
Endocarditis	observational	2.3	✓	PCT is an independent predictor with high diagnostic accuracy for acute endocarditis	
Meningitis	before-after	0.5	✓	PCT reduces antibiotic exposure during outbreak of viral meningitis	
Neutropenia	observational	0.1-0.5	✓	PCT is helpful at identifying neutropenic patients with systemic bacterial infection	
Pancreatitis	observational	0.25-0.5	~	PCT correlates with severity and extent of infected pancreatitis	
Pneumonia	RCT	0.1-0. 5; 80-90% ↓	✓✓✓	PCT reduces antibiotic without adverse outcomes exposure in the hospital	
Postoperative fever	observational	0.1-0.5	✓	PCT differentiates non-infectious fever from post-operative infections	
Postoperative infections	RCT	0.5-1.0; 75-85% ↓	✓✓	PCT reduces antibiotic exposure without adverse outcomes in the surgical ICU	
Severe sepsis/Shock	RCT	0.25-0.5; 80-90% ↓	✓✓✓	PCT reduces antibiotic exposure without adverse outcomes in the ICU	
Upper respiratory tract infections	RCT	0.1-0.25	✓✓	PCT reduces antibiotic exposure without adverse outcomes in primary care	
Urinary tract infections	observational	0.25	✓	PCT correlates with severity of urinary tract infections	
Ventilator-associated pneumonia	RCT	0.1-0.25	✓✓	PCT reduces antibiotic exposure without adverse outcomes	

== Medical uses ==
=== Sepsis ===
Measurement of procalcitonin can be used as a marker of severe sepsis caused by bacteria and generally grades well with the degree of sepsis, although levels of procalcitonin in the blood are very low. PCT has the greatest sensitivity (90%) and specificity (91%) for differentiating patients with systemic inflammatory response syndrome (SIRS) from those with sepsis, when compared with IL-2, IL-6, IL-8, CRP and TNF-alpha. Evidence is emerging that procalcitonin levels can reduce unnecessary antibiotic prescribing to people with lower respiratory tract infections. Currently, procalcitonin assays are widely used in the clinical environment.

A meta-analysis reported a sensitivity of 76% and specificity of 70% for bacteremia.

A 2018 systematic review comparing PCT and C-reactive protein (CRP) found PCT to have a sensitivity of 80% and a specificity of 77% in identifying septic patients. In the study, PCT outperformed CRP in diagnostic accuracy of predicting sepsis.

In a 2018 meta-analysis of randomized trials of over 4400 ICU patients with sepsis, researchers concluded that PCT led therapy resulted in lower mortality and lower antibiotic administration.

=== Organ rejection ===
Immune responses to both organ rejection and severe bacterial infection can lead to similar symptoms such as swelling and fever that can make initial diagnosis difficult. To differentiate between acute rejection of an organ transplant and bacterial infections, plasma procalcitonin levels have been proposed as a potential diagnostic tool. Typically the levels of procalcitonin in the blood remain below 0.5 ng/mL in cases of acute organ rejection, which has been stated previously to be well below the 1 μg/mL typically seen in bacterial infection.

=== Respiratory illnesses ===
Given procalcitonin is a blood marker for bacterial infections, evidence shows that it is a useful tool in guiding the initiation and duration of antibiotics in patients with bacterial pneumonia and other acute respiratory infections. The use of procalcitonin guided antibiotic therapy leads to lower mortality, less antibiotic usage, decreased side effects due to antibiotics and promotes good antibiotic stewardship. The value in these protocols are evident since a high PCT level correlates with increased mortality in critically ill pneumonia patients especially those with a low CURB-65 pneumonia risk factor score.

In adults with acute respiratory infections, a 2017 systematic review found that PCT-guided therapy reduced mortality, reduced antibiotic use (2.4 fewer days of antibiotics) and led to decreased adverse drug effects across a variety of clinical settings (ED, ICU, primary care clinic).

Procalcitonin-guided treatment limits antibiotic exposure with no increased mortality in patients with acute exacerbation of chronic obstructive pulmonary disease.

Using procalcitonin to guide protocol in acute asthma exacerbation led to reduction in prescriptions of antibiotics in primary care clinics, emergency departments and during hospital admission. This was apparent without an increase in ventilator days or risk of intubation. Be that acute asthma exacerbation is one condition that leads to overuse of antibiotics worldwide, researchers concluded that PCT could help curb over-prescribing.

=== Cardiovascular disease ===
PCT serves a marker to help differentiate acute respiratory illness such as infection from an acute cardiovascular concern. It also has value as a prognostic lab value in patients with atherosclerosis or coronary heart disease as its levels correlate with the severity of the illness.

The European Society of Cardiology recently released a PCT-guided algorithm for administering antibiotics in patients with dyspnea and suspected acute heart failure. The guidelines use a cut off point of .2 ng/mL and above as the point at which to give antibiotics. This coincides with a 2017 review of literature which concluded that PCT can help reduce antibiotic overuse in patients presenting with acute heart failure. In regards to mortality, a meta analysis of over 5000 patients with heart failure concluded that elevated PCT was reliable in predicting short term mortality.

=== Meningitis ===
Blood procalcitonin levels can help confirm bacterial meningitis and, if negative, can effectively rule out bacterial meningitis. This was shown in a review of over 2000 patients in which PCT had a sensitivity of 86% and a specificity of 80% for cerebrospinal fluid PCT. Blood PCT measurements proved superior to cerebrospinal fluid PCT with a sensitivity of 95% and a specificity of 97% as a marker for bacterial meningitis.

In acute meningitis, serum PCT is useful as a biomarker for sepsis. It can also be of use in determining viral meningitis versus bacterial meningitis. These findings are the result of a 2018 literature review. This followed a 2015 meta analysis that showed that PCT had a sensitivity of 90% and a specificity of 98% in judging viral versus bacterial meningitis. PCT also outperformed other biomarkers such as C-reactive protein.

=== Gastrointestinal disease ===
Evidence shows that an elevated PCT above .5 ng/mL could help diagnose infectious complications of inflammatory bowel disease such as abdominal abscesses, bacterial enterocolitis etc. PCT can be effective in early recognition of infections in IBD patients and decisions on whether to prescribe antibiotics.

=== Kidney disease ===
Patients with chronic kidney disease and end-stage renal disease are at higher risk for infections, and procalcitonin has been studied in these populations, who often have higher levels. Procalcitonin can be dialyzed, and so levels are dependent upon when patients receive hemodialysis (HD). While there is no formally accepted cutoff value for patients undergoing HD, using a value of greater or equal to 0.5 ng/mL yielded a sensitivity of 97-98% and a specificity of 70-96%.

=== Hepatitis ===
PCT, possibly together with CRP, is used to corroborate the MELD score.

=== Septic arthritis ===
PCT at a cutoff value of .5 ng/mL was effective at ruling in septic arthritis in an analysis of over 8000 patients across 10 prospective studies. PCT had a sensitivity of 54% and specificity of 95%. The study also concluded that PCT outperforms C-reactive protein in differentiating septic arthritis from non-septic arthritis.

=== Cancer ===
A 2016 literature review showed that PCT has good value in diagnosing infections in oncologic patients. Moreso, it is especially effective in diagnosing major life threatening episodes in cancer patients such as bacteremia and sepsis. Procalcitonin is reliable to monitor recurrence of medullary thyroid carcinoma. In detecting cancer recurrence, PCT had a sensitivity and specificity of 96% and 96% respectively.

=== Pediatrics ===
In a meta analysis of 17 studies, PCT had a sensitivity of 85% and a specificity of 54% in diagnosing sepsis in neonates and children. The PCT cut off used was between 2-2.5 ng/mL.

In children presenting with fever without an apparent source, a PCT level of .5 ng/mL had a sensitivity of 82% and specificity of 86%. At a 5 ng/mL value, the sensitivity and specificity were 61% and 94%. PCT can help the clinical decision making while identifying invasive bacterial infection in children with unexplained fever.

PCT levels correlate with the degree of illness in pediatric patients with sepsis or urinary tract infections making it effective as a prognostic lab value in these patients.

=== Antibiotic stewardship ===
Procalcitonin guided cessation of antibiotic use reduces duration of antibiotic exposure and lowers mortality in critically ill patients in the Intensive Care Unit.

In adult emergency department patients with respiratory tract illnesses, PCT-guided treatment groups had reduced antibiotic use. PCT references ranges are also used to determine the likelihood a patient has systemic infection (sepsis), thereby reducing incidence of unnecessary antibiotic use in cases where sepsis is unlikely.

Although some literature differs in antibiotic cessation requirements, the general consensus is to stop antibiotics when procalcitonin levels fall 80% below peak or below 0.5 μg/L at day five or later during antibiotic therapy.

== PCT and amphetamines ==
Excessive overdose on amphetamine or its analogs can induce systemic inflammation; in a case report of amphetamine overdose, without bacterial infection, significant elevations in procalcitonin were observed.
