= Lower respiratory tract infection =

Medical term

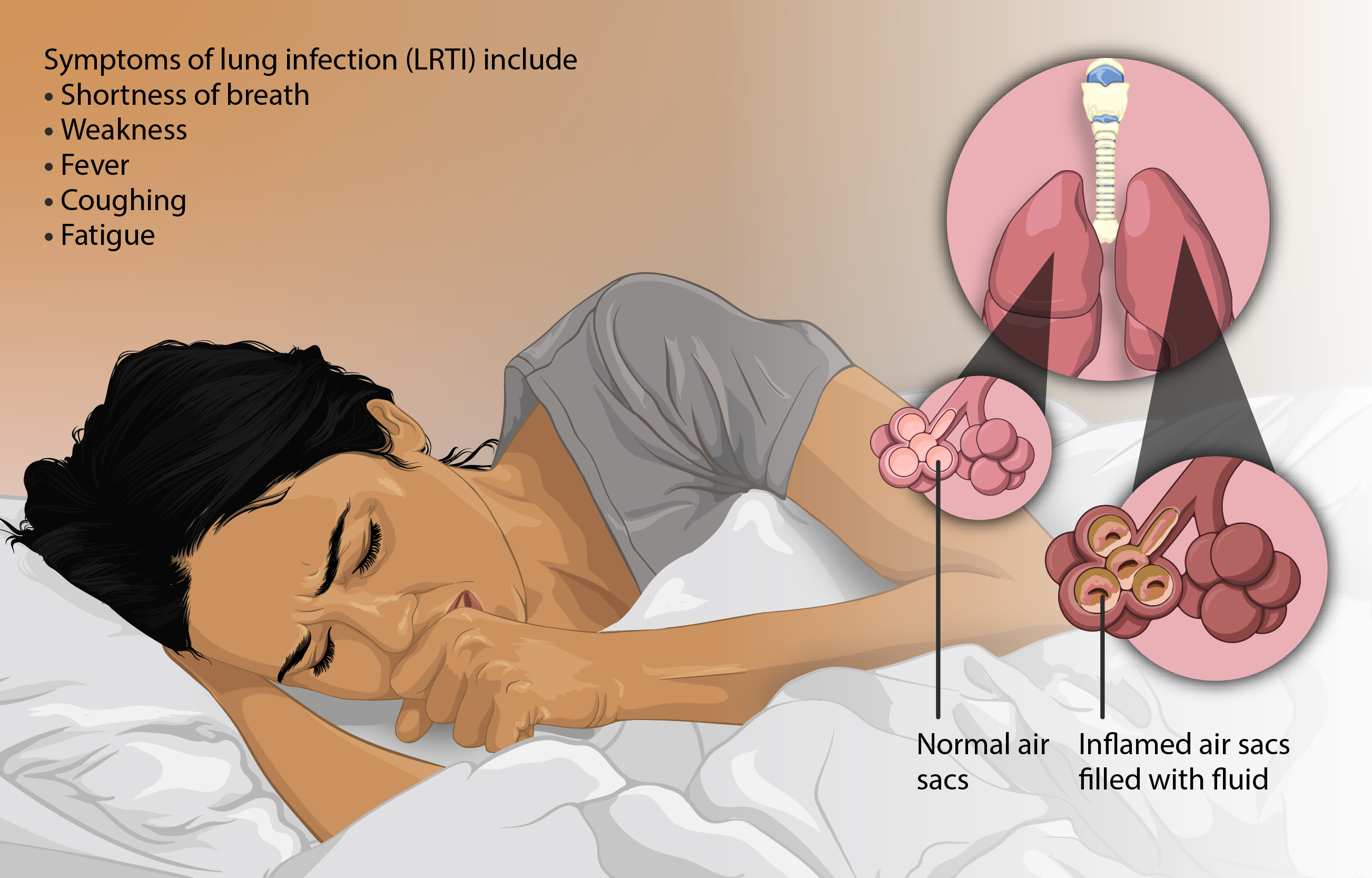
- Depiction of a person with LRTI
- Specialty: Pulmonology
- Frequency: 291 million (2015)
- Deaths: 2.74 million (2015)

Lower respiratory tract infection (LRTI) is a term often used as a synonym for pneumonia but can also be applied to other types of infection including lung abscess and acute bronchitis. Symptoms include shortness of breath, weakness, fever, coughing and fatigue. A routine chest X-ray is not always necessary for people who have symptoms of a lower respiratory tract infection.

Influenza affects both the upper and lower respiratory tracts.

Antibiotics are the first line treatment for pneumonia; however, they are neither effective nor indicated for parasitic or viral infections. Acute bronchitis typically resolves on its own with time.

In 2015 there were about 291 million cases. These resulted in 2.74 million deaths down from 3.4 million deaths in 1990. This was 4.8% of all deaths in 2013.

The World Health Organization has reported that, in 2021, "Lower respiratory infections remained the world's most deadly communicable disease other than COVID-19, ranked as the fifth leading cause of death." However, the number of deaths caused has decreased by around 13% from 2000 to 2021.

== Bronchitis ==
Bronchitis describes the swelling or inflammation of the bronchial tubes. Additionally, bronchitis is described as either acute or chronic depending on its presentation and is also further described by the causative agent. Acute bronchitis can be defined as acute bacterial or viral infection of the larger airways in healthy patients with no history of recurrent disease. It affects over 40 adults per 1000 each year and consists of transient inflammation of the major bronchi and trachea. Most often it is caused by viral infection and hence antibiotic therapy is not indicated in immunocompetent individuals. Viral bronchitis can sometimes be treated using antiviral medications depending on the virus causing the infection, and medications such as anti-inflammatory drugs and expectorants can help mitigate the symptoms. Treatment of acute bronchitis with antibiotics is common but controversial as their use has only moderate benefit weighted against potential side effects (nausea and vomiting), increased resistance, and cost of treatment in a self-limiting condition. Beta2 agonists are sometimes used to relieve the cough associated with acute bronchitis. In a recent systematic review it was found there was no evidence to support their use.

Acute exacerbations of chronic bronchitis (AECB) are frequently due to non-infective causes along with viral ones. 50% of patients are colonised with Haemophilus influenzae, Streptococcus pneumoniae, or Moraxella catarrhalis. Antibiotics have only been shown to be effective if all three of the following symptoms are present: increased dyspnea, increased sputum volume, and purulence. In these cases, 500 mg of amoxicillin orally, every 8 hours for 5 days or 100 mg doxycycline orally for 5 days should be used.

== Pneumonia ==
Pneumonia occurs in a variety of situations and treatment must vary according to the situation. It is classified as either community or hospital acquired depending on where the patient contracted the infection. It is life-threatening in the elderly or those who are immunocompromised. The most common treatment is antibiotics and these vary in their adverse effects and their effectiveness. Pneumonia is also the leading cause of death in children less than five years of age in low income countries. The most common cause of pneumonia is pneumococcal bacteria, Streptococcus pneumoniae accounts for 2/3 of bacteremic pneumonias. Invasive pneumococcal pneumonia has a mortality rate of around 20%. For optimal management of a pneumonia patient, the following must be assessed: pneumonia severity (including treatment location, e.g., home, hospital or intensive care), identification of causative organism, analgesia of chest pain, the need for supplemental oxygen, physiotherapy, hydration, bronchodilators and possible complications of emphysema or lung abscess.

== Causes ==
Typical bacterial Infections:

- Haemophilus influenzae
- Staphylococcus aureus
- Klebsiella pneumoniae

Atypical bacterial Infections:

- Legionella pneumophila
- Mycoplasma pneumoniae
- Chlamydophila pneumoniae
- Chlamydia psittaci

Parasitic infections:

- Respiratory cryptosporidiosis

Viral infections:

- Adenovirus
- Influenza A virus
- Influenza B virus
- Human parainfluenza viruses
- Human respiratory syncytial virus
- Severe acute respiratory syndrome coronavirus (SARS-CoV)
- Middle East respiratory syndrome coronavirus (MERS-CoV)
- Severe acute respiratory syndrome coronavirus 2 (SARS-CoV-2)

Aspiration pneumonia

== Prevention ==
Vaccination helps prevent bronchopneumonia, mostly against influenza viruses, adenoviruses, measles, rubella, streptococcus pneumoniae, haemophilus influenzae, diphtheria, bacillus anthracis, chickenpox, and bordetella pertussis. Specifically for the children with low serum retinol or who are suffering from malnutrition, vitamin A supplements are recommended as a preventive measure against acute LRTI.

== Treatment ==
Antibiotics do not help the many lower respiratory infections which are caused by parasites or viruses. While acute bronchitis often does not require antibiotic therapy, antibiotics can be given to patients with acute exacerbations of chronic bronchitis. The indications for treatment are increased dyspnoea, and an increase in the volume or purulence of the sputum. The treatment of bacterial pneumonia is selected by considering the age of the patient, the severity of the illness and the presence of underlying disease. A systematic review of 32 randomised controlled trials with 6,078 participants with acute respiratory infections compared procalcitonin (a blood marker for bacterial infections) to guide the initiation and duration of antibiotic treatment, against no use of procalcitonin. Among 3,336 people receiving procalcitonin-guided antibiotic therapy, there were 236 deaths, compared to 336 deaths out 3,372 participants who did not. Procalcitonin-guided antibiotic therapy also reduced the antibiotic use duration by 2.4 days, and there were fewer antibiotic side effects. This means that procalcitonin is useful for guiding whether to use antibiotics for acute respiratory infections and the duration of the antibiotic. Amoxicillin and doxycycline are suitable for many of the lower respiratory tract infections seen in general practice. Another cochrane review suggests that new studies are needed to confirm that azithromycin may lead to less treatment failure and lower side effects than amoxycillin. In the other hand, there is no sufficient evidence to consider the antibiotics as a prophylaxis for the high risk children under 12 years.

Oxygen supplementation is often recommended for people with severe lower respiratory tract infections. Oxygen can be provided in a non-invasive manner using nasal prongs, face masks, a head box or hood, a nasal catheter, or a nasopharyngeal catheter. For children younger than 15 years old, nasopharyngel catheters or nasal prongs are recommended over a face mask or head box. A Cochrane review in 2014 presented a summary to identify children complaining of severe LRTI, however; further research is required to determine the effectiveness of supplemental oxygen and the best delivery method.

== Epidemiology ==
Pneumonia mortality by age

Lower respiratory infectious disease is the fifth-leading cause of death and the combined leading infectious cause of death, being responsible for 2.74 million deaths worldwide. This is generally similar to estimates in the 2010 Global Burden of Disease study. This total only accounts for Streptococcus pneumoniae and Haemophilus influenzae infections and does not account for atypical or nosocomial causes of lower respiratory disease, therefore underestimating total disease burden.

== Society and culture ==
Lower respiratory tract infections place a considerable strain on the health budget and are generally more serious than upper respiratory tract infections.

Workplace burdens arise from the acquisition of a lower respiratory tract infection, with factors such as total per person expenditures and total medical service utilisation demonstrated as greater among individuals experiencing a lower respiratory tract infection.

Pan-national data collection indicates that childhood nutrition plays a significant role in determining the acquisition of a lower respiratory tract infection, with the promotion of the implementation of nutrition program, and policy guidelines in affected countries.
