= FOXF1 =

Protein-coding gene in the species Homo sapiens

Identifiers
- Aliases: FOXF1, ACDMPV, FKHL5, FREAC1, forkhead box F1
- External IDs: OMIM: 601089; MGI: 1347470; GeneCards: FOXF1

Gene location (Human)
| Chr. | Chromosome 16 (human) |
| Band | 16q24.1 | Start | 86,510,527 bp |
| Band | 16q24.1 | End | 86,515,422 bp |

Gene location (Mouse)
| Chr. | Chromosome 8 (mouse) |
| Band | 8 E1|8 70.31 cM | Start | 121,811,125 bp |
| Band | 8 E1|8 70.31 cM | End | 121,814,883 bp |
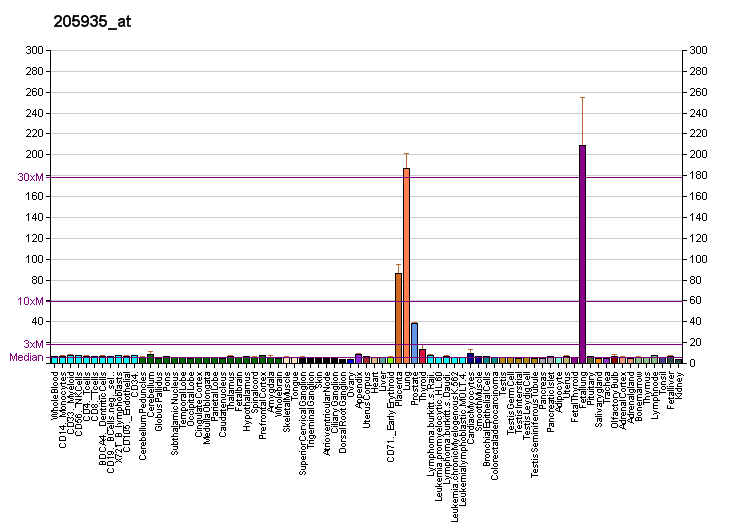
RNA expression pattern
| Bgee | Human / Mouse (ortholog); Top expressed in: muscle layer of sigmoid colon; gastric mucosa; right lung; lower lobe of lung; urinary bladder; mucosa of urinary bladder; buccal mucosa cell; upper lobe of lung; upper lobe of left lung; pylorus / Top expressed in: right lung lobe; left lung lobe; migratory enteric neural crest cell; molar; somatopleuric mesenchyme; lamina propria of urethra; mandibular prominence; urinary bladder; extraembryonic membrane; yolk sac; More reference expression data |
| BioGPS | More reference expression data |
Gene ontology
| Molecular function | DNA binding; sequence-specific DNA binding; RNA polymerase II transcription regulatory region sequence-specific DNA binding; DNA-binding transcription factor activity; DNA-binding transcription activator activity, RNA polymerase II-specific; transcription factor activity, RNA polymerase II distal enhancer sequence-specific binding; DNA-binding transcription factor activity, RNA polymerase II-specific |
| Cellular component | transcription regulator complex; nucleus |
| Biological process | somitogenesis; regulation of smooth muscle cell differentiation; renal system development; ureter development; regulation of transcription, DNA-templated; lung morphogenesis; embryonic foregut morphogenesis; lung development; positive regulation of cell migration; endocardial cushion development; cellular response to organic cyclic compound; extracellular matrix organization; cardiac left ventricle morphogenesis; in utero embryonic development; negative regulation of transcription by RNA polymerase II; negative regulation of mast cell degranulation; smooth muscle cell differentiation; morphogenesis of a branching structure; venous blood vessel development; cellular response to cytokine stimulus; right lung morphogenesis; transcription, DNA-templated; vasculogenesis; positive regulation of transcription, DNA-templated; respiratory tube development; development of the heart; determination of left/right symmetry; establishment of epithelial cell apical/basal polarity; blood vessel development; embryonic ectodermal digestive tract morphogenesis; positive regulation of mesenchymal cell proliferation; embryonic digestive tract morphogenesis; animal organ morphogenesis; pancreas development; detection of wounding; mesenchyme migration; smoothened signaling pathway; lateral mesodermal cell differentiation; lung alveolus development; digestive tract development; lung vasculature development; mesoderm development; epithelial tube branching involved in lung morphogenesis; negative regulation of inflammatory response; lung lobe morphogenesis; ductus arteriosus closure; embryonic digestive tract development; positive regulation of transcription by RNA polymerase II; epithelial cell differentiation involved in mammary gland alveolus development; midgut development; positive regulation of cell-substrate adhesion; transcription by RNA polymerase II; cell differentiation; cell-cell adhesion; trachea development |
Sources:Amigo / QuickGO
Orthologs
| Databases | NCBI: entry; OMA: entry |
| Species | Human | Mouse |
| Entrez | 2294 | 15227 |
| Ensembl | ENSG00000103241 | ENSMUSG00000042812 |
| UniProt | Q12946 | Q61080 |
| RefSeq (mRNA) | NM_001451 | NM_010426 |
| RefSeq (protein) | NP_001442 | NP_034556 |
| Location (UCSC) | Chr 16: 86.51 – 86.52 Mb | Chr 8: 121.81 – 121.81 Mb |
| PubMed search |
- Wikidata
| View/Edit Human | View/Edit Mouse |

Forkhead box protein F1 (FOXF1) is a protein that in humans is encoded by the FOXF1 gene.

== Function ==
This gene belongs to the forkhead family of transcription factors which is characterized by a distinct forkhead domain. FOX1 protein is important in the development of the pulmonary mesenchyme and the development of the gastrointestinal tract.
