= Postoperative fever =

Medical symptom after a surgical procedure

Postoperative fever refers to an elevated body temperature (≥ 38.5 °C) occurring after a recent surgical procedure. Diagnosing the cause of postoperative fever can sometimes be challenging; while fever in this context may be benign, self-limited, or unrelated to the surgical procedure, it can also be indicative of a surgical complication, such as infection.

== Causes ==
The most common causes of postoperative fever are often summarized for medical students by a mnemonic beginning with the letter W. The classic list consists of five W's – Wind, Water, Wound, Walking, and Wonder Drugs, but two other causes should also be considered – Wing/Waterway and (W)abscess. There is a characteristic timeframe after surgery when many of these complications tend to develop (postoperative days or POD).

Category	Day	Description
Wind	POD 1-2	the lungs, i.e. pneumonia, aspiration, and pulmonary embolism; atelectasis has been commonly cited as a cause of post-operative fever, but supporting evidence is lacking
Water	POD 3-5	urinary tract infection, possibly catheter-associated (if a urinary catheter was inserted during surgery or remains in place currently i.e. Foley catheter )
Wound	POD 5-7	infection of the surgical incision(s), either superficial or deep
(W)abscess	POD 5-7	infection of an organ or space
Walking (or VEINS pronounced like "Weins")	POD 5+ (risk may persist for months post-operatively)	deep vein thrombosis or pulmonary embolism
Wonder drugs or “What did we do?”	Anytime	drug fever or reaction to blood products, either a febrile non-hemolytic transfusion reaction or transfusion-related acute lung injury
Wing/Waterway	Anytime	bloodstream infection, phlebitis, or cellulitis related to intravenous lines, either central or peripheral

Other important causes of early post-operative fever that are omitted from this list include malignant hyperthermia, a potentially life-threatening but treatable response to inhalational anesthetic and paralytic agents.

Early postoperative fever (i.e., within the first 48 hours post-operatively) has often been ascribed to atelectasis, or splinting, but it is most likely part of a natural and non-infectious inflammatory response (with sympathetic nervous system involvement) to the tissue injury sustained during surgery; it generally requires no medical intervention except antipyretics and extra fluid intake.

== Workup ==
The diagnostic workup of post-operative fever is guided by the potential etiologies on the differential diagnosis. The patient's surgical and post-operative course should be reviewed in detail, noting whether the patient has been regularly using an incentive spirometer or not, whether a Foley catheter was/is in place, what medications s/he has received, etc. The patient should be asked if s/he is having any pain (and where?) or other symptoms such as coughing or dysuria, which may help to localize the source of the fever. A thorough physical exam should be conducted, auscultating the lungs, noting erythema or drainage from the surgical incision(s), evaluating IV sites, noting lower extremity edema, etc.

Laboratory testing and imaging is generally deferred for evaluation of fever that occurs within the first 48 hours post-operatively, unless prompted by specific findings in the history and physical exam. Beyond 48 hours, testing routinely includes urine and blood cultures as well as a chest X-ray.

== Popular culture ==
In the pilot episode of the medical drama Grey's Anatomy, Meredith Grey refers to this mnemonic: "Wind, water, wound, walking, wonder drugs. The 5 Ws. Most of the time it’s wind; splinting or pneumonia. Pneumonia is easy to assume. Especially if you're too busy to do the tests."

== See also ==
- Patient safety
- Perioperative mortality
