= Lobar pneumonia =

Lung infection

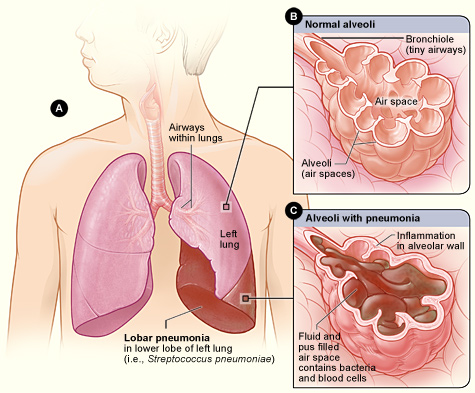
- Figure A shows the location of the lungs and airways in the body. This figure also shows pneumonia affecting the lower lobe of the left lung. Figure B shows normal alveoli. Figure C shows infected alveoli.
- Specialty: Pulmonology

Lobar pneumonia is a form of pneumonia characterized by inflammatory exudate within the intra-alveolar space resulting in consolidation that affects a large and continuous area of the lobe of a lung.

It is one of three anatomic classifications of pneumonia (the other being bronchopneumonia and atypical pneumonia). In children round pneumonia develops instead because the pores of Kohn which allow the lobar spread of infection are underdeveloped.

== Pathophysiology ==
The invading organism starts multiplying, thereby releasing toxins that cause inflammation and edema of the lung parenchyma. This leads to the accumulation of cellular debris within the lungs. This leads to consolidation or solidification, terms used for macroscopic or radiologic appearance of the lungs affected by pneumonia. Bacterial pneumonia is mainly classified into lobar and diffuse depending on the degree of lung irritation or damage.

== Stages ==
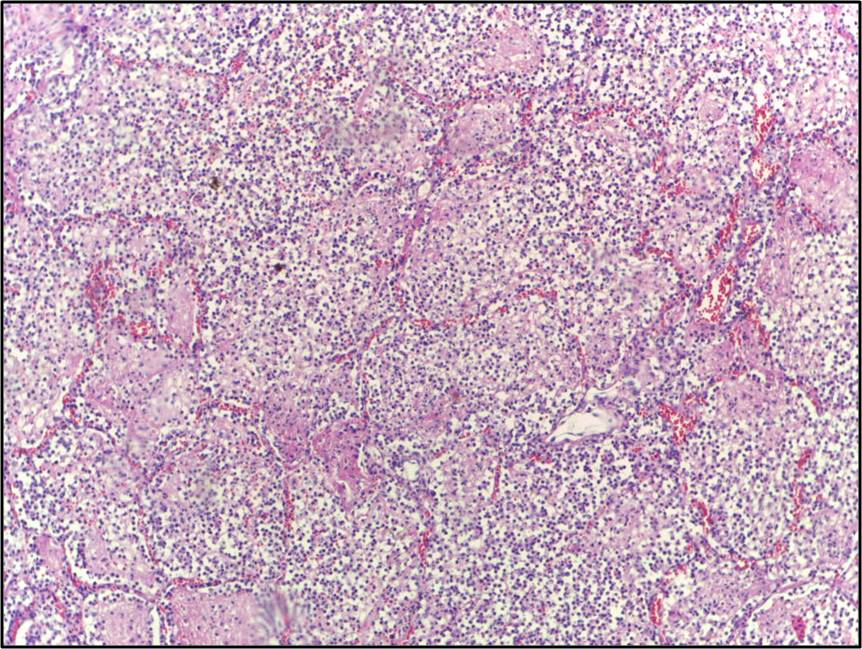
Micrograph of lobar pneumonia, H&E stain.

Lobar pneumonia usually has an acute progression. Classically, the disease has four stages:

- Congestion in the first 24 hours: This stage is characterized histologically by vascular engorgement, intra-alveolar fluid, and small numbers of neutrophils, often numerous bacteria. Grossly, the lung is heavy and hyperemic.
- Red hepatization or consolidation: Vascular congestion persists, with extravasation of red blood cells into alveolar spaces, along with increased numbers of neutrophils and fibrin. The filling of air spaces by the exudate leads to a gross appearance of solidification, or consolidation, of the alveolar parenchyma. This appearance has been likened to that of the liver, hence the term "hepatization".
- Grey hepatization: Red blood cells disintegrate, with the persistence of neutrophils and fibrin. The alveoli still appear consolidated, but grossly the color is paler and the cut surface is drier. This is when death typically occurs in severe cases.
- Resolution (complete recovery): The exudate is digested by enzymatic activity, and cleared by macrophages or by cough mechanism. Enzymes produced by neutrophils will liquefy exudates, and this will either be coughed up in sputum or drained via lymph.

== In children ==
The openings between the alveoli known as the pores of Kohn, and the collateral airways of the canals of Lambert, are undeveloped in children. The spread of infection that would otherwise occur is prevented and can result in round pneumonia, most commonly caused by S. pneumoniae. This clinically presents with an initial mild respiratory infection, followed by fever. On imaging it presents as an opaque pulmonary consolidation which is unusually round and can resemble a lung mass. However, it quickly resolves with antibiotics.

== Diagnosis ==
The most common organisms which cause lobar pneumonia are Streptococcus pneumoniae, also called pneumococcus, Haemophilus influenzae and Moraxella catarrhalis. Mycobacterium tuberculosis, the tubercle bacillus, may also cause lobar pneumonia if pulmonary tuberculosis is not treated promptly. Other organisms that cause lobar pneumonia are Legionella pneumophila and Klebsiella pneumoniae.

Like other types of pneumonia, lobar pneumonia can present as community-acquired, in immune-suppressed patients, or as a nosocomial infection. However, most causative organisms are of the community-acquired type. Pathological specimens to be obtained for investigations include:

1. Sputum for culture, AAFBS, and gram stain
2. Blood for full hemogram/complete blood count, ESR, and other acute phase reactants
3. Procalcitonin test, more specific

On a posteroanterior and lateral chest radiograph, an entire lobe will be radiopaque, which is indicative of lobar pneumonia.

Chest radiograph of a lobar pneumonia, affecting the right middle lobe.

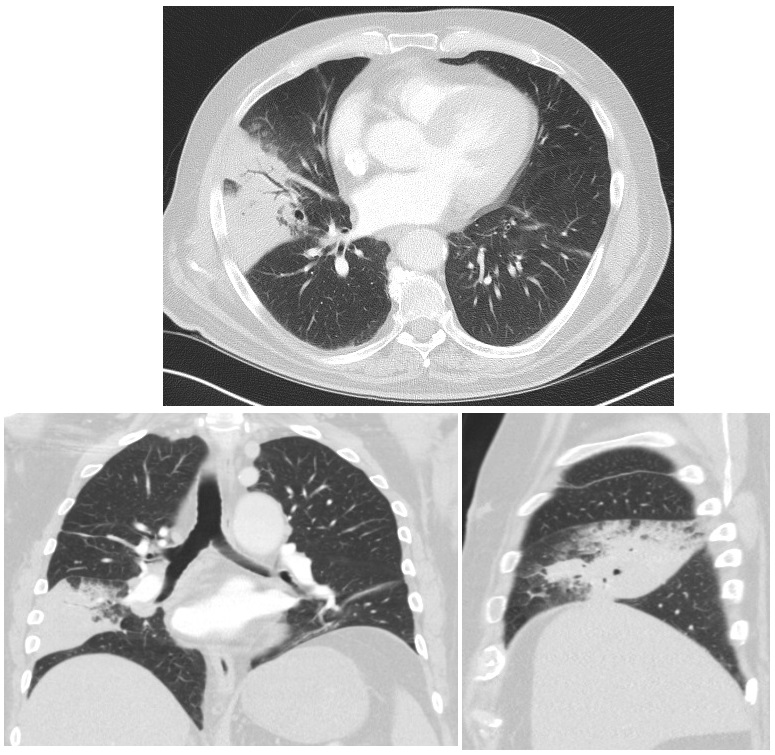
CT scan of the same case.

Identifying the infectious organism (or other cause) is an important part of modern treatment of pneumonia. The anatomical patterns of distribution can be associated with certain organisms, and can help in selection of an antibiotic while waiting for the pathogen to be cultured.
