= Hepatization of lungs =

Conversion of the lungs into a liver-like substance

Hepatization of the lungs is an old name for changes to the visual appearance of the lungs so that they resemble the liver. This happens when they are gorged with effuse matter and are no longer pervious to the air. The main cause is lobar pneumonia. Hepatization appears in ultrasounds as consolidations.

Red hepatization is the presence of red blood cells, neutrophils, and fibrin in the pulmonary alveolus/alveoli. The texture of the lungs changes, and, unlike healthy lungs, they no longer float if placed in a bowl of water.

Red hepatization may precede or be found in combination with gray hepatization, where the red cells have been broken down, leaving a fibrinosuppurative exudate.

Yellow hepatization is uncommon due to treatment with antibiotics, but it may occasionally be seen, e.g., during an autopsy.

Transformation from red hepatization to gray hepatization is an example for acute inflammation turning into a chronic inflammation.
