= Pores of Kohn =

Discrete holes in the wall of the lungs that aide in movement of cells and pathogens

The pores of Kohn (also known as interalveolar connections or alveolar pores) are discrete holes in walls of adjacent alveoli. Cuboidal type II alveolar cells, which produce surfactant, usually form part of aperture.

== Etymology ==
The pores of Kohn take their name from the German physician and pathologist Hans Nathan Kohn (1866–1935) who first described them in 1893.

== Development ==
They are absent in human newborns. They develop at 3–4 years of age along with canals of Lambert during the process of thinning of alveolar septa.

== Function ==
The pores allow the passage of other materials such as fluid and bacteria, which is an important mechanism of spread of infection in lobar pneumonia and spread of fibrin in the grey hepatisation phase of recovery from the same. They also equalize the pressure in adjacent alveoli and, combined with increased distribution of surfactant, thus play an important role in prevention of collapse of the lung.

Unlike adults, in children these inter-alveolar connections are poorly developed which aids in limiting the spread of infection. This is thought to contribute to round pneumonia.
