= Secarecytosis =

Secarecytosis is a process involved in the development of a bird's lung cells, before the bird hatches from its egg. It is the processes of cell cutting during attenuation of the tubular epithelium of the developing avian lung. The word secarecytosis is derived from the Latin word secare which means "to cut".

Secarecytosis differs from holocrine and apocrine secretory mechanisms in that it occurs only during development and that portions of cells, complete with their organelles, are lost. It has three documented phenotypes. These are:

- formation of a double cell membrane and separation between the two membranes;
- formation of large vacuoles in the supranuclear cytoplasm, their subsequent fusion with each other and with the lateral cell membranes thus separating the apical portion;
- formation of many tiny vesicles that fuse with each other and the cell membrane thus severing portions of the cell.

The process was initially described in the domestic chicken but it has also been shown to occur in the ostrich.
