= Collateral ventilation =

System of alveolar ventilation

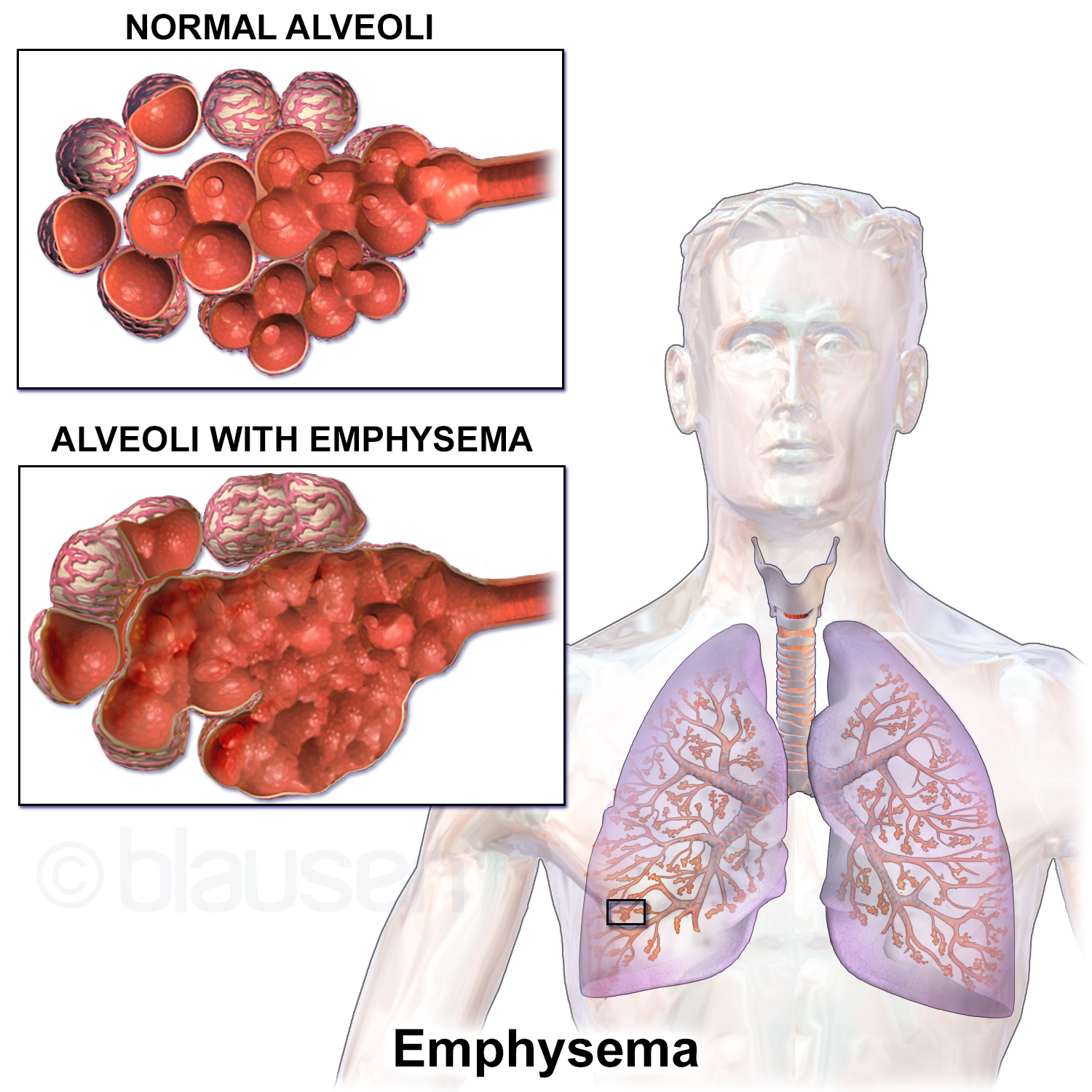
Emphysema

Collateral ventilation is a back-up system of alveolar ventilation that can bypass the normal route of airflow when airways are restricted or obstructed. The pathways involved include those between adjacent alveoli (pores of Kohn), between bronchioles and alveoli (canals of Lambert), and those between bronchioles (channels of Martin). Collateral ventilation also serves to modulate imbalances in ventilation and perfusion, a feature of many diseases. The pathways are altered in lung diseases particularly asthma, and emphysema. A similar functional pattern of collateralisation is seen in the circulatory system of the heart.

Interlobar collateral ventilation has also been noted and is a major unwanted factor in the consideration of lung volume reduction surgery and some lung volume reduction procedures.

== Pathways ==
In normal respiratory conditions, airflow is through the pathway of least resistance offered by the bronchial tree, to the alveoli and back to the bronchi and trachea. In this normal state the pathways of collateral ventilation offer a greater resistance to airflow and are thus redundant or insignificant. However, when the normal airflow is compromised by ageing or disease such as emphysema, the normal pathway becomes increasingly resistant and the pathways of collateral ventilation become the least resistant. The pathways are provided by openings between adjacent alveoli known as the pores of Kohn; a pathway is provided through channels between bronchioles known as the channels of Martin; openings connecting some bronchioles with adjacent alveoli are known as the canals of Lambert. Openings between lobes have been described as interlobular channels and between segments as intersegmental.

=== Anatomy ===
The interalveolar pores of Kohn are epithelial-lined openings between adjacent alveoli, with a diameter of between three and thirteen micrometres (μm). These were first described by Hans Kohn in 1893, who believed that the pores only opened in times of disease. The pores of Kohn are usually filled with fluid and only open in response to a high pressure gradient across them. The fluid may contain alveolar lining fluid, components of surfactant, and macrophages. There are between 13 and 21 pores in each alveolus and about half of these are found on the bottom walls. Their average length is from 7 to 19 μm. It has been suggested that the pores of Kohn are too small to offer a pathway of decreased resistance, and that the larger interbronchiolar channels of Martin are the primary site of collateral ventilation.

The bronchoalveolar canals of Lambert were described by Lambert as communications that reached from respiratory bronchioles to the alveolar ducts and sacs that they supplied. These canals have a muscular wall with possible regional airflow control. They range in size from partly closed to 30 μm.

The interbronchiolar channels of Martin have a diameter of 30 μm and are found between respiratory bronchioles and terminal bronchioles of adjacent segments. The diameter of these channels is given as between 80 and 150 μm in other sources.

Interlobular channels have been described as short and tubular with a diameter of 200 μm.

== Clinical significance ==
The presence of interlobar collateral ventilation will affect the choice of lung volume reduction procedure that may be offered in severe cases of emphysema. Emphysema usually develops in later years from the breakdown of alveolar walls resulting in much larger airspaces and much larger pathways for a preferential route of collateral ventilation. Ageing can alter the size of the pores of Kohn, further reducing the normal resistance of the collateral ventilation pathways. In lung volume reduction procedures interlobular collateral ventilation is a major factor that can affect a successful outcome. A study showed that those with emphysema had a ten-fold increase of collateral ventilation over healthy controls.

The intent of lung volume reduction is to achieve the complete collapse (atelectasis) of an entire lobe of the lung in order to reduce volume in the chest, restore elastic recoil and improve breathing. Interlobar collateral ventilation can prevent this. Incomplete lung fissures that separate the lobes of the lung are fairly common and usually without consequence. These fissures are often bridged by parenchyma connecting the airspaces of one lobe with those of another and therefore providing a path for collateral ventilation. This type of parenchymal bridging would prevent the intended collapse of a targeted lobe. Interlobar collateral ventilation precludes the bronchoscopic procedure that uses endobronchial valves.

== History ==
The pores of Kohn were described over a hundred years ago in 1893 but their functional relevance was disputed. It was only in 1931 that they were acknowledged as acting as collaterals, and the term collateral respiration was first used. In 1955 Lambert described accessory communicating channels between respiratory bronchioles and the alveoli, known as the canals of Lambert. The presence of collateral ventilation was suggested to be the reason why those with emphysema used to be called pink puffers due to their pink cheeks; in emphysema, hyperventilation increases collateral ventilation which provides a significant level of oxygen to the blood. In chronic bronchitis where the airways are more affected than the lung parenchyma, collateral ventilation does not come into play and the blood is less oxygenated giving the bluish colour of the blue bloaters.

== Other animals ==
Collateral ventilation is not present in horses who have a poor tolerance to airway obstruction but it is present in dogs who have a better tolerance for obstruction.
