= Shock of birth =

Temporary muscle tone reduction in newborns

Shock of birth is the transient depression of muscle tone and deep tendon reflexes that occurs in newborns after birth. In 70% of newborns, it lasts less than 24 hours, and in 84.3% less than 48 hours. Its presence is not affected by whether birth happened through vaginal delivery or cesarean delivery. The term was introduced in 1960.

== See also ==
- Adaptation to extrauterine life
