= Adaptation to extrauterine life =

Neonatal adaptations

At the end of pregnancy, the fetus must take the journey of childbirth to leave the reproductive mother. Upon its entry to the air-breathing world, the newborn must begin to adjust to life outside the uterus. This is true for all viviparous animals; this article discusses humans as the most-researched example.

The outside environment is a drastic change for the neonate; therefore, the neonate must be assessed frequently and thoroughly. The Apgar scale is an assessment performed immediately following birth. It consists of assessing heart rate, respiratory effort, muscle tone, reflex irritability, and overall skin color. Apgar scoring is performed one minute and five minutes after birth. Scoring ranges from 0 to 10, with 0 indicating severe neonatal distress and 10 indicating a smooth transition to extrauterine life.

Newborns transitioning into extrauterine life will undergo periods of reactivity. These periods are divided into three stages. The first stage occurs in the first 30 minutes of life; during this stage, the infant is alert and responsive with heart rate peaking at 160–180 beats per minute and then stabilizes to a baseline rate of 100–120 beats per minute. Crackles upon auscultation and irregular respirations are a normal finding. In the second stage, there is a decrease in responsiveness and motor activity, often manifesting as sleep. This period can last from 1–2 hours. The third stage marks the second period of reactivity. This period can occur anywhere from 2 to 8 hours after birth and lasts from 10 minutes to several hours. Tachycardia and tachypnea may be present during brief periods. Passing of meconium also occurs.

== Cardiac ==
=== Physiology ===
In utero, the placenta delivers oxygenated blood to the fetus through the umbilical vein. Upon delivery, the umbilical cord is cut. The cardiovascular system must now adapt. Blood CO_{2} rises because it is now not removed by the placenta. This is a powerful stimulus for the infant to start breathing. Breathing sharply increases O_{2} in the lungs, thus quickly reverting hypoxic pulmonary vasoconstriction that had held the pulmonary vascular resistance high during the uterine life. Lung ventilation also extends the so far convoluted, shrunk pulmonary vessels, also contributing to the quick and marked drop in the pulmonary vascular resistance. As a result, a much higher proportion of the right ventricle output flows into the pulmonary vessels than into the systemic circulation through the ductus arteriosus. The detachment of the placenta causes an increase in systemic vascular resistance, which leads to an increase in pressure gradient from the left atrium. The left atrium now has higher pressure than the right atrium, causing the foramen ovale to close. Within the first 10 minutes of birth, blood begins to flow left-to-right through the ductus arteriosus. This causes a significant increase in the output of the left ventricle and an increase in stroke volume. Subsequently, calcium channel activity increases and potassium channel decreases, furthering ductal constriction. Functional closure of the ductus arteriosus occurs within the first 24 hours, with permanent closure following within 4 weeks. Lastly, cardiac output increases to nearly double what it was in utero. All of these cardiovascular system changes result in the adaptation from fetal circulation patterns to an adult circulation pattern. During this transition, some types of congenital heart disease that were not symptomatic in utero during fetal circulation will present with cyanosis or respiratory signs.

Changing the composition of hemoglobin before and after birth. Also identifies the types of cells and organs in which the gene expression (data on Wood W.G., (1976). Br. Med. Bull. 32, 282.)

=== Manifestations ===
When the newborn cries, there is a reversal of blood flow through the foramen ovale, which causes the newborn to appear mildly cyanotic in the first few days of life. The heart rate of the newborn should be between 110 and 160 beats per minute, and it is common for the heart rate to be irregular in the first few hours following birth. The heart sounds will have a variation in pitch, duration, and intensity than that of an adult. Blood pressure readings should range from 60 to 80 mm Hg systolic and 40–50 mm Hg diastolic. Mean arterial pressure should be the same as the weeks of gestation at birth. Within the first hour after birth, there may be a drop of up to 15 mm Hg in the systolic blood pressure.

Delayed cord clamping is defined as waiting more than 2 minutes to clamp the newborn's umbilical cord. This has been proven to be beneficial in improving hematocrit and iron while also decreasing anemia. These benefits can last up to 6 months for the newborn.

=== Assessments/interventions ===
Assessment and monitoring of vital signs and skin color are important in detecting cardiovascular issues in the infant. The apical pulse rate should be auscultated for one full minute when the newborn is calm or sleeping. Any irregular heart rate after the first few hours of life that is not related to crying or another outside factor should be monitored and evaluated. Blood pressure will be taken with an appropriately sized cuff, preferably when the newborn is at rest. Consistent tachycardia should be evaluated for conditions such as anemia, hyperthermia, hypovolemia, and sepsis. Consistent bradycardia could be an indication of congenital heart block or hypoxemia. Pallor and central cyanosis (cyanosis in hands and feet is a common and normal finding) can also indicate cardiovascular issues.

== Ventilation and oxygenation ==
=== Physiology ===
Upon birth, the newborn's lungs become the center for gas exchange. There are a variety of factors that influence newborn respiratory functions; these factors include chemical, mechanical, thermal, and sensory. Respirations begin when fetal aortic and carotid chemoreceptors are stimulated by the varying concentrations of oxygen and carbon dioxide. During vaginal birth, the newborn's chest is compressed by the birth canal. Upon delivery, negative pressure allows air into the lungs. The first cries of the infant allow for alveoli expansion and absorption of fetal lung fluid. Temperature changes and other sensory stimulation contribute to respiratory function as well.

=== Manifestations ===
Breathing patterns are often irregular and shallow. The infant's respiration rate should be between 30 and 60 breaths per minute, with a preference for nasal breathing. Ribs expand horizontally. Breath sounds should be clear and equal in both lungs. Abdominal breathing is normal. Acrocyanosis is a normal finding.

=== Assessments and interventions ===
Suctioning of nasal and oral secretions promotes fluid clearance. Auscultation of lung sounds to assess for any abnormalities. Pulse oximetry is performed to determine oxygen saturation. Monitor signs of respiratory distress such as: nasal flaring, grunting, central cyanosis.

== Metabolic ==
=== Physiology ===
At birth, the newborn is cut off from the mother's glucose supply and will begin to rely on stored fat for energy. Glycogen stores are maximal at term. Within the first hour of life, blood glucose will typically reach its lowest point and then stabilize within 2 to 4 hours; hence breastfeeding is promoted immediately. In cases where feeding is delayed, the neonate can use lactate, free-fatty acids, and ketone bodies.

=== Manifestations ===
Normal blood glucose levels range from 40 to 50 mg/dl. Rooting and sucking reflexes should be present, and the neonate will eat small amounts frequently. All vital signs should be within normal limits, coinciding with the neonate's presentation of calmness and satiation.

=== Assessments and interventions ===
Monitor blood glucose level and encourage breastfeeding or formula feeding as early as possible. Lactation and breastfeeding education should be provided as appropriate.

== Temperature regulation ==
=== Physiology ===
Newborns lack the ability for thermogenesis due to an underdeveloped shivering mechanism. Body heat is lost through conduction, convection, and radiant heat. Thermoregulation is achieved through several methods: the metabolism of brown fat and Kangaroo care, also known as skin-to-skin. "Brown fat" is specialized adipose tissue with a high concentration of mitochondria designed to rapidly oxidize fatty acids to generate metabolic heat. Skin to skin to care is the immediate placement of the neonate directly onto a caregiver's bare chest. This promotes thermoregulation of the neonate through heat generated by the caregiver.

=== Manifestations ===
Normal temperature ranges from 97.7 to 100.0 °F (36.5 to 37.8 °C). Cold infants may cry or appear restless. The neonates' arms and legs maintain a fetal position, lessening their body surface area and reducing heat loss.

=== Assessments and interventions ===
Dry the neonate immediately after birth and initiate skin-to-skin contact. Provide warm blankets and a hat. Utilize a radiant warmer if skin-to-skin is not appropriate. Frequently monitor axillary body temperature. Limit the neonate's exposure during diaper changes and assessments.

== See also ==
- Shock of birth
