= Bronchopulmonary segment =

Portion of lung supplied by a segmental bronchus

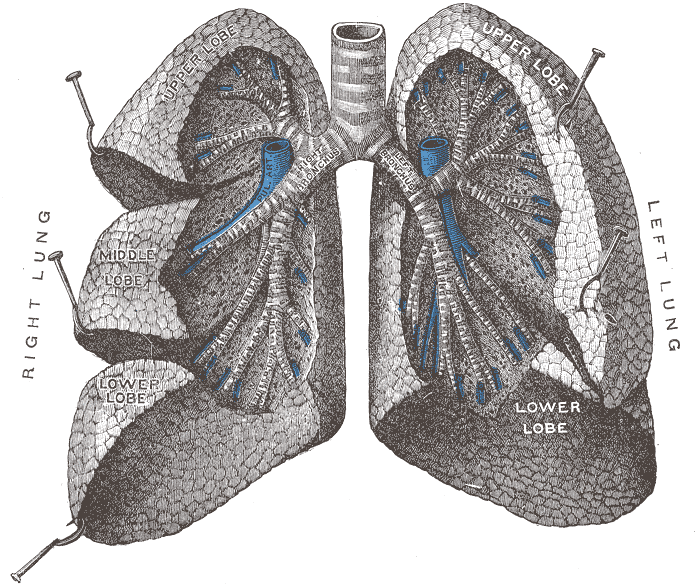
- Bronchopulmonary segments visible but not labeled.

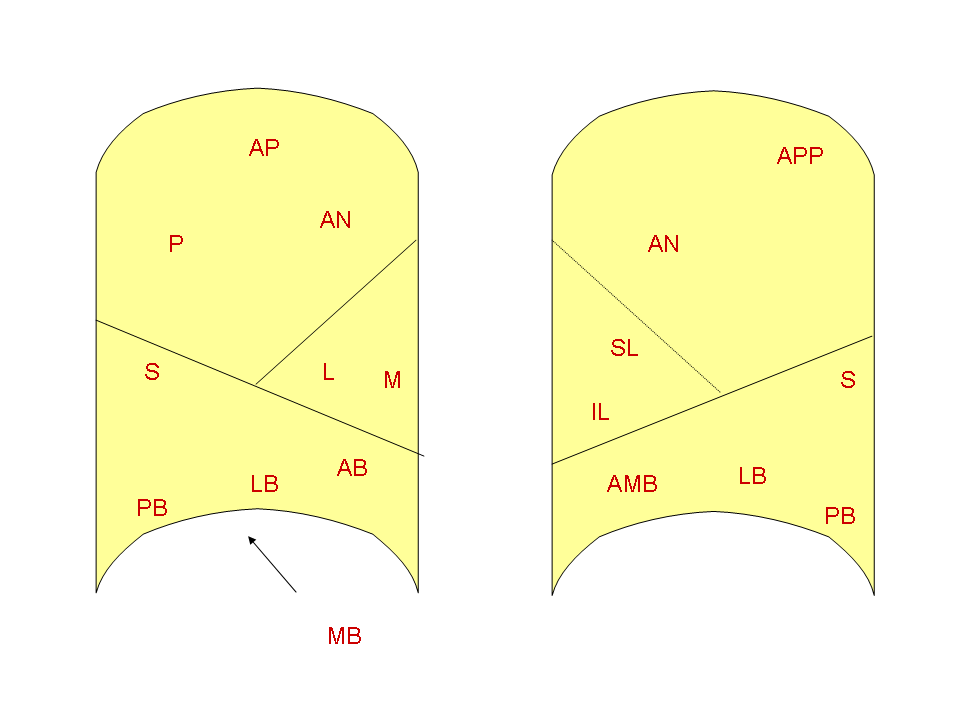

Details

Identifiers
- Latin: segmenta bronchopulmonalia
- TA98: A06.5.02.001
- TA2: 3280
- FMA: 76495

A bronchopulmonary segment is a portion of lung supplied by a specific segmental bronchus and its vessels. These arteries branch from the pulmonary and bronchial arteries, and run together through the center of the segment. Veins and lymphatic vessels drain along the edges of the segment. The segments are separated from each other by layers of connective tissue that forms them into discrete anatomical and functional units. This separation means that a bronchopulmonary segment can be surgically removed without affecting the function of the others.

There are ten bronchopulmonary segments in the right lung: three in the superior lobe, two in the middle lobe, and five in the inferior lobe. Some of the segments may fuse in the left lung to form usually eight to nine segments (four to five in the upper lobe and four to five in the lower lobe. The delineation of the bronchopulmonary segments was made by Chevalier Jackson and John Franklin Huber at Temple University Hospital.

== Right lung ==
- Superior lobe
  - apical segment
  - posterior segment
  - anterior segment
- Middle lobe
  - lateral segment
  - medial segment
- Inferior lobe
  - superior segment
  - medial-basal segment
  - anterior-basal segment
  - lateral-basal segment
  - posterior-basal segment

== Left lung ==
- Superior lobe
  - apico-posterior segment (merger of "apical" and "posterior")
  - anterior segment
- Lingula of superior lobe
  - inferior lingular segment
  - superior lingular segment
- Inferior lobe
  - superior segment
  - anteromedial basal segment (merger of "anterior basal" and "medial basal")
  - posterior basal segment
  - lateral basal segment

== Clinical significance ==
- Usually the infection of the bronchopulmonary segment remains restricted to it, although tuberculosis and bronchogenic carcinoma may spread from one segment to another.
- Visualising the interior of the bronchi through a bronchoscope passed through the mouth and trachea, procedure is called bronchoscopy.
- The carina of the trachea is a hook shaped process projecting backward from the lower margin of lowest tracheal ring. It helps to divide the trachea into two primary bronchi. The right bronchus makes an angle of 25°, while the left one makes an angle of 45°.
- The carina is a sensitive area. When the patient is made to lie on their left side, secretions from the right bronchial tree flow toward the Carina due to the effect of gravity. This stimulates the cough reflex, and sputum is brought out. This is called postural drainage.
- Paradoxical Respiration: during inspiration, the flail (abnormally mobile) segments of ribs are pulled inside the chest wall while during expiration the ribs are pushed out.
- Tuberculosis of the lung is a common disease in certain parts of the world. A complete course of treatment must be taken under the guidance of a physician.
- Bronchial Asthma is a common disease of the respiratory system. It occurs due to bronchospasm of smooth muscles in the wall of the bronchials).
