= Sibson =

Sibson may refer to:

== Places ==
- Sibson, Cambridgeshire
- Sibson, Leicestershire
- Peterborough/Sibson Airport, also known as Sibson aerodrome, near Peterborough, Cambridgeshire

== People ==
- Gareth Sibson (born 1977), British writer, broadcaster and lawyer
- Harry Sibson (1919–2010)
- Francis Sibson (1814–1876), British physician and anatomist
- John Sibson (1930–2014), Australian politician
- Richard B. Sibson (1911–1994), New Zealand ornithologist
- Richard H. Sibson (born 1945), New Zealand geologist
- Robin Sibson (1944–2017), British mathematician and educator
- Tony Sibson (born 1958), British professional boxer
- Thomas Sibson (1817–1844), English artist

== Anatomy ==
- Sibson's aortic vestibule, the aortic vestibule
- Sibson's fascia, the suprapleural membrane
- Sibson's aponeurosis, the suprapleural membrane
- Sibson's groove, formed by the prominent lower border of the pectoralis major muscle
- Sibson's muscle, the scalenus minimus muscle
