= Pleural disease =

Illness of the pleural space

- Specialty: Respirology

Pleural disease occurs in the pleural space, which is the thin fluid-filled area in between the two pulmonary pleurae in the human body. There are several disorders and complications that can occur within the pleural area, and the surrounding tissues in the lung.

== Pleural content anomalies ==
- Pneumothorax: a collection of air within the pleural cavity, arising either from the outside or from the lung. Pneumothoraces may be traumatic, iatrogenic, or spontaneous. A tension pneumothorax is a particular type of pneumothorax where the air may enter (though a defect of the chest wall, lung, or airways) on inspiration, but cannot exit on expiration. Each breath increases the amount of trapped air in the chest cavity, leading to further lung compression. This is often an urgent situation and may progress to a medical emergency if there is compromise of the venous return to the heart causing hypotension and rarely shock.
- Pleural effusion: a fluid accumulation within the pleural space. Abnormal collections of pleural fluid may be due to excessive fluid volume (i.e. excess intravenous fluids, kidney failure), decreased fluid protein (e.g. cirrhosis, proteinuria), heart failure, bleeding (hemothorax), infections (parapneumonic effusions, pleural empyema), inflammation, malignancies, or perforation of thoracic organs (i.e. chylothorax, esophageal rupture).

== Pleural tumors ==
Pleural tumors may be benign (i.e. solitary fibrous tumor) or malignant in nature. Pleural mesothelioma is a type of malignant cancer associated with asbestos exposure. Under most other circumstances, pleural cancers are secondary malignancies associated with lung cancer due to its nearby location or as metastasis such as with breast cancer.

  - Mesothelial tumors: pleural malignant mesothelioma.
  - Pleural sarcomas
    - Pleural angiosarcoma
    - Pleural desmoplastic small round cell tumor (pleural DSRCT)
    - Pleural synovial sarcoma
    - Pleural solitary fibrous tumor (pleural SFT, can be benign or less commonly malignant)
  - Smooth muscle tumors of the pleura
  - Pleural carcinomas
    - Pleural mucoepidermoid carcinoma
    - Pleural pseudomesotheliomatous adenocarcinoma

== Other pleural diseases ==
- Pulmonary embolism
- Pleurisy
- Pneumonia
- Pleural infections
- Pleural endometriosis
- Pleuritis
- Pleural mesothelial hyperplasia
- Pleural calcified fibrous pseudotumor
- Pleural thickening, including pleural plaques

== See also ==
- Pleural cavity
