= Atrioventricular opening =

Atrioventricular opening may refer to:

- Right atrioventricular orifice
- Left atrioventricular orifice
