= Milky spots =

Small areas of lymphoid tissue

Milky spots are very small white-coloured areas of lymphoid tissue, found in the peritoneal, pleural and pericardial cavities. These are the three coelomic cavities that form as separate compartments from the intraembryonic coelom.

More milky spots are found on the greater omentum in the peritoneal cavity than anywhere else. The milky spots are made up of mesenchymal cells and are covered in a layer of mesothelium. These structures surround the small blood vessels. The enclosing mesothelium contains macrophages, lymphocytes and mast cells. They are also known as secondary lymphoid organs. Most milky spots contain extremely thin-walled lymphatic capillaries. The macrophages are usually located on the edge of the milky spot and the lymphocytes in the middle. Other structural elements are plasmocytes and various connective tissue cells including reticular and elastic fibres. There is seen to be a delicate framework of reticular fibres supporting the structure.

Blood supply is from the gastroepiploic arteries. Nerve supply is found underneath the mesothelium. Milky spots first appear in the human fetus at week 26 (becoming apparent as such at 35 weeks) and continue to develop after birth until they reach maximum numbers by the end of the first year. The numbers then start to decline with age.

Milky spots are seen as playing an important first-line defence role in the immune system as well as other functions. They have been identified as being an early target of secondary tumors and their response is seen to be possibly of use in therapy.
