= Prothyrum =

Porch or vestibule in front of the main entrance of an ancient or medieval building

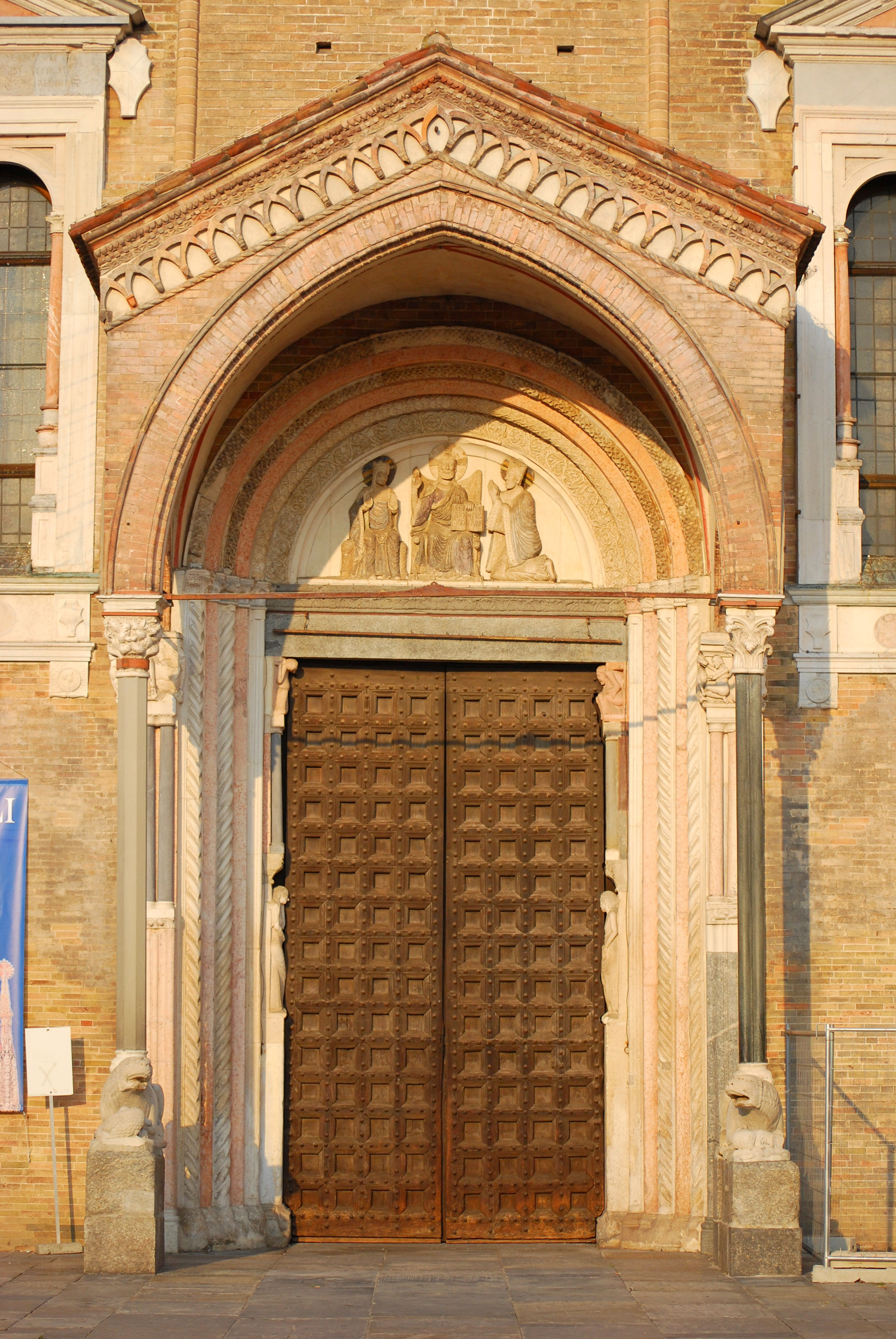
Prothyrum of Lodi Cathedral

A prothyrum (Romanization of Greek πρόθυρον próthyron 'in front of the door'), in classical and medieval architecture, is a small porch, vestibule, or covered space immediately in front of the main doorway of a building. In architecture of the Greco-Roman world it was the transitional, often columned, space before the entrance proper. In the Late Antique and Byzantine periods, it could be a forecourt or portico preceding the narthex of a church or the main gateway of a monastic or palatial ensemble.

== Etymology ==
The Greek noun πρόθυρον (próthyron) literally means “the space before the door”. It can be spelled prothyron or the Latinized prothyrum in late Republican and Imperial texts.

== Definition and function ==
In a narrow sense, a prothyrum is a shallow, often roofed architectural element marking and protecting the principal entrance. It could be formed by:

- a simple canopy or lintelled projection above the doorway;
- a portico with one or two columns (in antis) carried in front of the façade;
- a small enclosed antechamber that mediates the exterior and the interior space.

In Roman domestic architecture, authors distinguish between the vestibulum facing the street and the prothyrum that could articulate the immediate threshold zone before the atrium. In Late Antique and Byzantine religious architecture the word is sometimes used for the porch or fore‑narthex preceding the church proper, or for the covered space before a ceremonial gateway of a palace or monastery.

== In medieval and early modern usage ==
In medieval Latin texts from Southern Italy and the Byzantine Commonwealth the term (or its Greek equivalent) survives to denote porches attached to churches and fortified gatehouses. Early modern antiquarians, following classical dictionaries, reintroduced the latinised form in architectural glossaries, where it largely overlaps with the broader English words porch and vestibule.

== See also ==
- Vestibule
- Portico
- Narthex
- Propylaea
- Aedicula
