= Embryonic coelom =

Embryonic coelom may refer to:

- Extra-embryonic coelom
- Intra-embryonic coelom
