= Simple squamous epithelium =

Tissue type

Simple squamous epithelium (pavement epithilium)
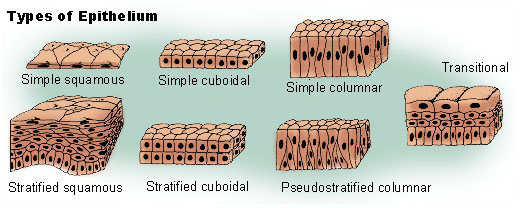
- Epithelium

- Schematic view of simple squamous epithelium

Identifiers
- TH: H2.00.02.0.02002
- FMA: 45565

A simple squamous epithelium, also known as pavement epithelium or tessellated epithelium, is a single layer of flattened, polygonal cells that line various structures in the body. This epithelium facilitates passive diffusion and filtration due to its thinness. It is found in areas such as the alveoli of the lungs, the lining of blood vessels (endothelium), and the serous membranes of body cavities.

== Structure ==
Simple squamous epithelium consists of a single layer of flat, scale-like cells with centrally located, flattened nuclei. The cells are tightly packed together, forming a smooth surface. This arrangement minimizes the distance for diffusion, making it ideal for areas where rapid exchange of gases, nutrients, and waste products is necessary.

== Function ==
The primary functions of simple squamous epithelium include:

- Diffusion: Facilitates the exchange of gases in the lungs and nutrients in capillaries.
- Filtration: In the kidneys, it allows for the filtration of blood plasma into the nephron.
- Secretion: In serous membranes, it secretes lubricating fluids to reduce friction between organs.
- Protection: Provides a barrier against mechanical injury and pathogens in certain locations.

This type of epithelium is often permeable and occurs where small molecules need to pass quickly through membranes via filtration or diffusion. Simple squamous epithelia are found in endothelium (lining of blood and lymph capillaries), mesothelium (coelomic epithelium/peritoneum), alveoli of lungs, glomeruli, and other tissues where rapid diffusion is required. Within the cardiovascular system such as lining capillaries or the inside of the heart, simple squamous epithelium is specifically called the endothelium. Cells are flat with flattened and oblong nuclei. It is also called pavement epithelium due to its tile-like appearance. This epithelium is associated with filtration and diffusion. This tissue is extremely thin and forms a delicate lining. It offers very little protection.

== Locations ==
Simple squamous epithelium is located in:

- Alveoli of the lungs: Facilitates gas exchange.
- Endothelium: Lines blood and lymphatic vessels.
- Mesothelium: Forms the serous membranes lining body cavities such as the pericardium, pleura, and peritoneum.
- Bowman's capsule in the kidneys: Participates in the filtration of blood plasma.
- Inner surfaces of the heart: Forms the endocardium.
- Inner surface of the cornea and tympanic membrane: Provides a smooth surface for light transmission and sound conduction.

Simple squamous epithelium falls under the physiological category of exchange epithelium due to its ability to rapidly transport molecules across the tissue layer. To facilitate this movement, some types of simple squamous epithelium may have pores between cells to allow molecules to move through it, creating a leaky epithelium.

== Clinical Significance ==
Damage or dysfunction of simple squamous epithelium can lead to various health issues:

- Pulmonary edema: Impaired gas exchange in the alveoli.
- Atherosclerosis: Endothelial dysfunction leading to plaque formation in blood vessels.
- Peritonitis: Inflammation of the peritoneal lining due to infection.
- Nephrotic syndrome: Altered filtration in the kidneys affecting protein levels in urine.
