= Tissue membrane =

Biological membrane lining a cavity or surface

A tissue membrane is a thin layer or sheet of cells that covers the outside of the body (for example, skin), the organs (for example, pericardium), internal passageways that lead to the exterior of the body (for example, mucosa of stomach), and the lining of the moveable joint cavities. There are two basic types of tissue membranes: connective tissue and epithelial membranes.

== Connective tissue membrane ==
The connective tissue membrane is formed solely from connective tissue. These membranes encapsulate organs, such as the kidneys, and line our movable joints. A synovial membrane is a type of connective tissue membrane that lines the cavity of a freely movable joint. For example, synovial membranes surround the joints of the shoulder, elbow, and knee. Fibroblasts in the inner layer of the synovial membrane release hyaluronan into the joint cavity. The hyaluronan effectively traps available water to form the synovial fluid, a natural lubricant that enables the bones of a joint to move freely against one another without much friction. This synovial fluid readily exchanges water and nutrients with blood, as do all body fluids.

== Epithelial membrane ==
The epithelial membrane is composed of epithelium attached to a layer of connective tissue, for example, skin. The mucous membrane is also a composite of connective and epithelial tissues. Sometimes called mucosae, these epithelial membranes line the body cavities and hollow passageways that open to the external environment, and include the digestive, respiratory, excretory, and reproductive tracts. Mucus, produced by the epithelial exocrine glands, covers the epithelial layer. The underlying connective tissue, called the lamina propria (literally “own layer”), help support the fragile epithelial layer.

A serous membrane is an epithelial membrane composed of mesodermally derived epithelium called the mesothelium that is supported by connective tissue. These membranes line the coelomic cavities of the body, that is, those cavities that do not open to the outside, and they cover the organs located within those cavities. They are essentially membranous bags, with mesothelium lining the inside and connective tissue on the outside. Serous fluid secreted by the cells of the thin squamous mesothelium lubricates the membrane and reduces abrasion and friction between organs. Serous membranes are identified according locations. Three serous membranes line the thoracic cavity; the two pleura that cover the lungs and the pericardium that covers the heart. A fourth, the peritoneum, is the serous membrane in the abdominal cavity that covers abdominal organs and forms double sheets of mesenteries that suspend many of the digestive organs.

The skin is an epithelial membrane also called the cutaneous membrane. It is a stratified squamous epithelial membrane resting on top of connective tissue. The apical surface of this membrane is exposed to the external environment and is covered with dead, keratinized cells that help protect the body from desiccation and pathogens.

== Source text ==
The source of the contents will be mentioned as follows on Wikipedia articles included under the scope of this project: This article incorporates text from a free content work. Licensed under CC BY 4.0. Text taken from Anatomy and Physiology, J. Gordon Betts et al, Openstax. https://openstax.org/books/anatomy-and-physiology/pages/4-1-types-of-tissues.
