= Interpleural block =

Medical procedure

Interpleural block is a medical procedure in which a local anesthetic is injected into the thoracic cage between the parietal and visceral pleura. It is used to treat chest and lower abdomen pain.
