= Adventitia =

Outer layer of fibrous tissue surrounding a bodily organ

The adventitia (/ædvɛnˈtɪʃə/ ad-ven-TI-shuh) is the outer layer of fibrous connective tissue surrounding an organ.

The outer layer of connective tissue that surrounds an artery, or vein – the tunica externa, is also called the tunica adventitia.

To some degree, its role is complementary to that of the serosa, which also provides a layer of tissue surrounding an organ. In the abdomen, whether an organ is covered in adventitia or serosa depends upon whether it is peritoneal or retroperitoneal:

- intraperitoneal organs are covered in serosa (a layer of mesothelium, the visceral peritoneum)
- retroperitoneal organs are covered in adventitia (loose connective tissue)

In the gastrointestinal tract, the muscular layer is bounded in most cases by serosa. However, at the oral cavity, thoracic esophagus, ascending colon, descending colon and the rectum, the muscular layer is instead bounded by adventitia. The muscular layer of the duodenum is bounded by both tissue types. Generally, if it is a part of the digestive tract that is free to move, it is covered by serosa, and if it is relatively rigidly fixed, it is covered by adventitia.

The connective tissue of the gallbladder is covered by adventitia where the gallbladder bounds the liver, but by serosa for the rest of its surface.

== See also ==
- Lumen (anatomy)
- Serous membrane
