= Apical cap (lung) =

Radiologic finding at the lung apex

Apical cap is a descriptive radiology term for a thin, cap-shaped opacity at one or both lung apices seen on chest radiography or computed tomography (CT). It is commonly bilateral and is most often attributed to pleural and subpleural fibrotic change which drags down extrapleural fat.

== Etiology ==
Apical caps are described as being caused by pulmonary and/or pleural fibrosis, and chronic ischemia with elastotic fibrosis of the visceral pleura has been proposed as a potential mechanism, variably associated with aging. Apical cap–like opacities may also be produced by extrapleural or pleural fluid collections related to infection, neoplasm, or trauma; left-sided apical caps may occur with an apical hematoma (for example after aortic rupture).

== Imaging appearance ==
On chest radiographs, an apical cap may appear as an irregular density at the extreme lung apex and is often thin, but can be up to 30 mm. CT can help localize an apical opacity to pleural/extrapleural structures and identify associated fibrotic change, supporting the differential diagnosis.

== Clinical significance ==
Apical caps are frequently incidental. In many individuals—particularly older adults—they represent benign age-related subpleural scarring, but unilateral or markedly asymmetric apical opacities should prompt consideration of alternative causes, including superior sulcus (Pancoast) tumors and other lung, pleural, or extrapleural lesions.

== See also ==
- Pleural thickening
- Pancoast tumor
