= Endoexoenteric =

Pattern seen in radiologic examinations

Endoexoenteric refers to a specific radiographic manifestation of lymphoma of the bowel.

== Lymphoma ==
Lymphomas are malignant neoplasms (cancers) arising from lymphocytes of the immune system. When they arise in the bowel tissue, they are referred to as primary. In other instances, the tumor can arise from the lymph nodes and "travel" to the bowel, so-called "extra-nodal" disease.

== "Endoexoenteric" ==
=== Origin of Term ===
Marshak was the first to introduce the term "endoexoenteric" to refer to a specific radiographic pattern (seen on x-rays, CT scans or PET scans) of lymphomatous involvement of the bowel. This terminology derives from the fact that in this form of lymphomatous invasion of the bowel, the tumor extends throughout the entire width of the bowel wall, from the luminal or mucosal (endo) surface to the serosal (exo) surface. Enteric refers to the bowel itself. In Marshak's later textbook, published in 1980, he abandons this terminology.

=== Presentation ===
Of the five patterns of bowel lymphoma described in Marshak's original work, endoexoenteric is the second most common type (the others being: infiltrative [most common], multiple nodules, polypoidal mass, and mesenteric.)

=== Features ===
Specifically, the features of endoexoenteric lymphoma are an irregular collection of barium due to central ulceration, and displacement of adjacent bowel loops. In this form of lymphoma, fistula formation (an abnormal communication between the tumor and adjacent bowel loops) is common. Since the bowel is not sterile, infection can easily be introduced, leading to findings of mesenteric abscesses.

== Diagnosis ==
Imaging techniques, while very helpful in suggesting the presence of specific disease, cannot diagnose this (or any other neoplastic disease) with certainty. Definitive diagnosis is almost always achieved by biopsy, followed by microscopic, histologic and immunologic examination of the tissues obtained.

== Significance ==
Recognition of this type of lymphoma presentation is important, in that it may predict the future course and potential complications of this disease, thereby alerting clinicians to undertake surveillance and appropriate interventions.
