= Ralph Nicholson Wornum =

British artist and art historian

- Born: 29 December 1812
- Died: 15 December 1877
- Occupations: Art historian, writer

Ralph Nicholson Wornum (1812–1877) was a British artist, art historian and administrator. He was keeper and secretary of the National Gallery of London from 1855 until his death.

== Early life ==
He was the son of Robert Wornum the pianoforte maker, and was born at Thornton, near Norham, Northumberland, on 29 December 1812. Having studied at University College London in 1832, he gave up plans to read for the bar, and attended the studio of Henry Sass. In 1834 he went abroad, spending six years visiting galleries in Munich, Dresden, Rome, Florence and Paris.

== Art and design in London ==
At the end of 1839 Wornum settled in London as a portrait-painter. Thomas Sibson came to study with him. He was honourably mentioned in the Westminster Hall cartoon competition of 1840. In 1848 Wornum was appointed lecturer on art to the government schools of design, and lectured around England. Among his topics was Islamic design, and he suggested that his students should visit Owen Jones's reconstruction of the Alhambra at the Sydenham Crystal Palace.

In 1852 he was appointed librarian and keeper of casts to the Government schools of design, then under the direction of the Board of Trade. A reorganisation created the Department of Practical Art, and Henry Cole sent Wornum on a fact-finding mission to France.

== At the National Gallery ==
In December 1854 he was chosen as successor to Thomas Uwins and George Saunders Thwaites, as jointly Keeper of the National Gallery and Secretary to the trustees, on the recommendation of Sir Charles Eastlake, a reforming move in the administration of the Gallery, with a large increase in the salary. Eastlake himself was appointed Director of the Gallery in March 1855, and in the following July were issued Treasury minutes entirely reconstituting the administration. In 1860−1 Wornum was chiefly instrumental in getting the Turner collection, which had been banished first to Marlborough House, and then to South Kensington (1856–60), restored to its place in the National Gallery, in accordance with the terms of the artist's bequest. Wornum worked with John Ruskin on this project. Turner's legacy included some drawings considered obscene; it was alleged that Wornum burned them, and Ruskin watched him do it. This allegation is disputed by other scholars.

Wornum's energies were devoted to improvement and development, and he deprecated the separation of the pictures by British artists from those by foreigners. He died at his residence, 20 Belsize Square, South Hampstead, on 15 December 1877, leaving a widow and a large family.

== Works ==
From 1840 he contributed to the Penny Cyclopædia, and in 1841 to William Smith's Dictionary of Greek and Roman Antiquities, while he also wrote for the abortive Biographical Dictionary of the Society for the Diffusion of Useful Knowledge. In 1846 he began working for the Art Journal, and, having drawn attention to the shortcomings of the National Gallery catalogues then in circulation, he was authorised by Sir Robert Peel to compile an official catalogue. This appeared in 1847, and served as a model for similar publications.

In 1848 he published an Essay upon the Schools of Design in France. In 1851 he was awarded the prize offered by the Art Journal for the best essay on 'The Exhibition of 1851 as a Lesson in Taste.'

In 1855 Wornum edited and practically rewrote a Biographical Catalogue of the Principal Italian Painters, 'by a lady' (Maria Farquhar), while in 1856 he contributed the Lives of British artists to Edward Shepherd Creasy's British Empire. During 1861 he edited, in a sumptuous folio, with memoir and notes, The Turner Gallery, forming a series of sixty engravings. Walter Thornbury, in his Life of Turner (1862), passed some disparaging remarks upon Wornum; a reply came in an article in the Quarterly Review (April 1862), in which Wornum's work was commended. In the introduction to the Turner Gallery Wornum pleaded for an enlargement of the Trafalgar Square galleries, which were quite inadequate to contain the 725 pictures then belonging to the nation.

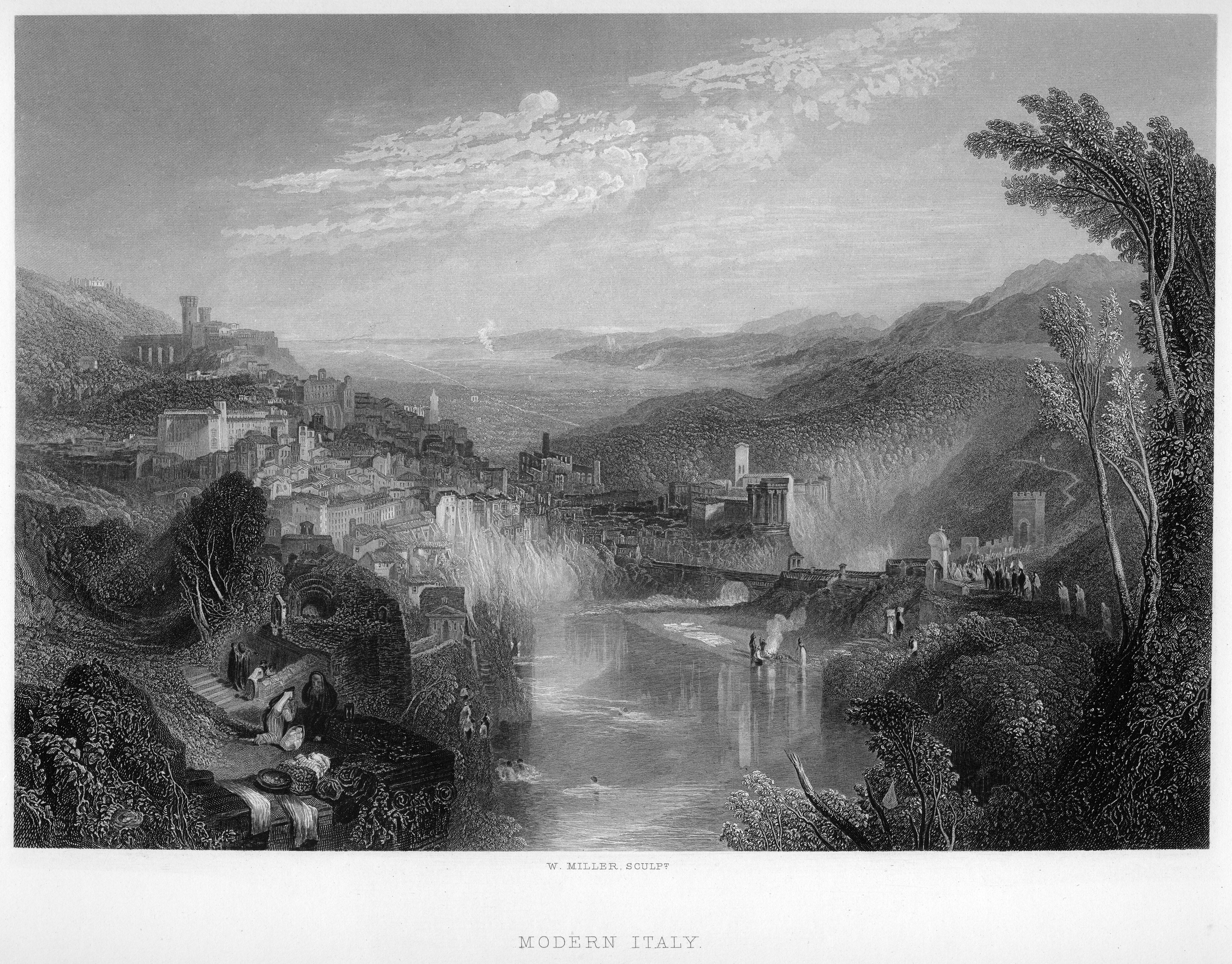
Engraving by William Miller from The Turner Gallery (1875).

Wornum's major publications were:

- ‘The Epochs of Painting: a biographical and critical Essay on Painting and Painters of all Times and many Places,’ London, 1847; enlarged, 1859 and 1864. This was dedicated by Wornum to the memory of his father. Appended to the later editions is ‘a table of the contributions of some of the more eminent painters to the exhibitions of the Royal Academy.’ This was adopted as a textbook for art school examinations.
- ‘Analysis of Ornament: the Characteristics of Style and Introduction to the Study of the History of Ornamental Art,’ London, 1856; 8th edit. 1893.
- ‘Some Account of the Life and Works of Hans Holbein, Painter, of Augsburg, with numerous illustrations,’ 1867. Appended was a catalogue of portraits and drawings by Holbein at Windsor.
- 'Saul of Tarsus; or Paul and Swedenborg. By a Layman,' London, 1877. Wornum had been a member of the New Church, though as a 'non-separatist' he remained in communion with the Church of England. In this book he expressed the notion of conflict between the teaching of Christ and the theology of St. Paul.

In addition Wornum edited:

- ‘Lectures on Painting’ [by Barry, Opie, and Fuseli], 1848, for the Bohn Library;
- Horace Walpole's 'Anecdotes of Painting in England,' with notes and emendations, London, 1849, 3 vols. (a revised edition appeared in 1888);
- 'The National Gallery;' a selection of pictures by the old masters, photographed by Leonida Caldesi (with annotations), London, 1868–73;
- 'Etchings from the National Gallery,' 18 plates, with notes, two series, 1876−8.

== Family ==
He married twice, his first wife was the American daughter of Judge Joseph Selden of Arkansas, who had been killed in a duel with Judge Andrew Scott. Their children included the architect Ralph Selden Wornum.
