= Intervenous tubercle =

Projection in the heart

Details

Identifiers
- Latin: tuberculum intervenosum
- TA98: A12.1.01.014
- FMA: 9270

The intervenous tubercle (tubercle of Lower) is a small projection on the posterior wall of the right atrium, above the fossa ovalis.

It is distinct in the hearts of quadrupeds, but in man is scarcely visible.

It was supposed by Lower to direct the blood from the superior vena cava toward the atrioventricular opening.
