= Perimetrium =

Layer of the wall of the uterus

- Uterus and uterine tubes (Perimetrium labeled at bottom right)

Details

Identifiers
- Latin: perimetrium, tunica serosa uteri

The perimetrium (or serous coat of uterus), is the outer serosal layer of the uterus, derived from the peritoneum overlying the uterine fundus, and can be considered a visceral peritoneum. It consists of a superficial layer of mesothelium, and a thin layer of loose connective tissue beneath it.

Anteriorly, the perimetrium covers the fundus and upper body of the uterus until it meets the superoposterior surface of the adjacent urinary bladder, resulting in a concave fold of peritoneum called the vesicouterine pouch. Posteriorly, the perimetrium covers the entire surface of the uterus deep down to the cervix, where it then folds back onto the adjacent rectum to form the rectouterine pouch, the lowest gutter of the peritoneal cavity. Laterally, the perimetrium blends into the serosae of the broad ligaments.
