= Thoracic wall =

Boundary of the chest cavity

- Body cavities

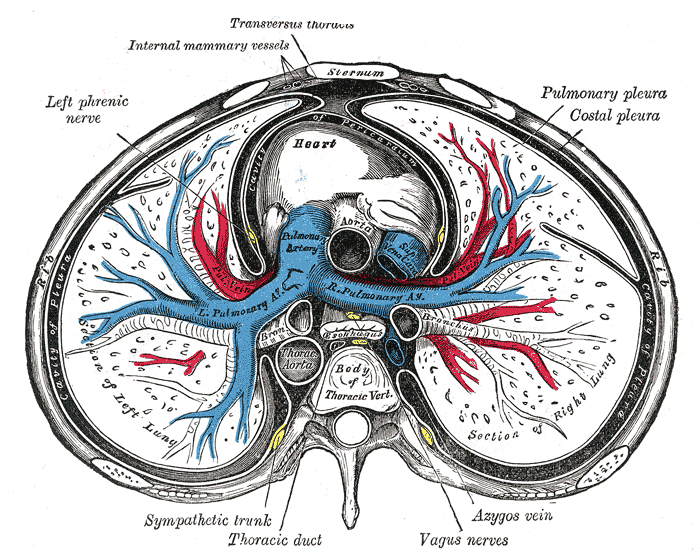
- A transverse section of the thorax, showing the contents of the middle and the posterior mediastinum.

Identifiers
- MeSH: D035441
- FMA: 10428

The thoracic wall or chest wall is the boundary of the thoracic cavity.

== Structure ==
The bony skeletal part of the thoracic wall is the rib cage, and the rest is made up of muscle, skin, and fasciae.

The chest wall has 10 layers, namely (from superficial to deep) skin (epidermis and dermis), superficial fascia, deep fascia and the invested extrinsic muscles (from the upper limbs), intrinsic muscles associated with the ribs (three layers of intercostal muscles), endothoracic fascia and parietal pleura. However, the extrinsic muscular layers vary according to the region of the chest wall. For example, the front and back sides may include attachments of large upper limb muscles like pectoralis major or latissimus dorsi, while the sides only have serratus anterior.The thoracic wall consists of a bony framework that is held together by twelve thoracic vertebrae posteriorly which give rise to ribs that encircle the lateral and anterior thoracic cavity. The first nine ribs curve around the lateral thoracic wall and connect to the manubrium and sternum.

== Function ==
=== Diving reflex ===
When not breathing for long and dangerous periods of time in cold water, a person's body undergoes great temporary changes to try to prevent death. It achieves this through the activation of the mammalian diving reflex, which has three main properties. Other than bradycardia and peripheral vasoconstriction, there is a blood shift which occurs only during very deep dives that affects the thoracic cavity (a chamber of the body protected by the thoracic wall). When this happens, organ and circulatory walls allow plasma/water to pass freely throughout the thoracic cavity, so its pressure stays constant and the organs are not crushed. In this stage, the lungs' alveoli fill up with blood plasma, which is reabsorbed when the organism leaves the pressurized environment. This stage of the diving reflex has been observed in humans (such as world champion free-diver Martin Štěpánek) during extremely deep (over 90 metres or 300 ft) free dives.

== Clinical significance ==
In rare cases, intentional or accidental, trauma may lead to chest wall (thoracic wall) necrosis.
