= Endothoracic fascia =

Layer of connective tissue of the thorax

Details

Identifiers
- Latin: fascia endothoracica
- TA98: A04.4.01.020
- TA2: 2323
- FMA: 57868

The endothoracic fascia is deep to the intercostal space

The endothoracic fascia is the layer of loose connective tissue deep to the intercostal spaces and ribs, separating these structures from the underlying pleura. This fascial layer is the outermost membrane of the thoracic cavity. The endothoracic fascia contains variable amounts of fat. It becomes more fibrous over the apices of the lungs as the suprapleural membrane. It separates the internal thoracic artery from the parietal pleura.
