= Coin test =

Medical diagnostic test

- Purpose: Test for a punctured lung

A coin test (or a bell metal resonance) is a medical diagnostic test used to test for a punctured lung. A punctured lung can cause air or fluid to leak into the pleural cavity, leading to, for example, pneumothorax or hydrothorax.

In a coin test, a coin held against the chest is tapped by another coin on the side where the puncture is suspected. A stethoscope is placed on the back to listen to breath sounds and the sound of the coins. If a tinkling sound is heard, it is likely that air or fluid has found its way into the pleural cavity.
