= Mesothelial hyperplasia =

Mesothelial hyperplasia is a reactive, benign disease that has no chance of becoming cancerous and is linked to several acute and chronic mesothelial surface injuries.

Mesothelial hyperplasia is typically discovered by accident when examining peritoneal washings, ascites, or biopsy specimens taken during a laparotomy or laparoscopy.

== Causes ==
The triggering injury may affect the superficial mesothelial cells directly or indirectly and may be inflammatory, infectious, or neoplastic in nature. Mesothelial hyperplasia is frequently seen in the following conditions: ovarian neoplasms (benign or malignant), peritoneal effusion from cardiac, renal, or hepatic insufficiency, and inflammatory pelvic disease with tubo-ovarian abscess.

== Diagnosis ==
Mesothelial hyperplasia is typified, if grossly apparent, by the presence of tiny white nodules as well as flat plaques on the peritoneal surface. Numerous architectural patterns, including solid, papillary, as well as tubular-papillary ones, can be observed at the microscopic level.

== Treatment ==
Mesothelial hyperplasia is benign. The underlying condition directly affects the course of treatment and prognosis, and neither clinical nor surgical intervention is necessary.

== See also ==
- Mesothelium
- Pleural disease
