= Suprapleural membrane =

Connective tissue covering the apex of each lung

Details

Identifiers
- Latin: membrana suprapleuralis
- TA98: A07.1.02.018
- TA2: 2324
- FMA: 57866

The suprapleural membrane, eponymously known as Sibson's fascia, is a structure described in human anatomy.

It is named for Francis Sibson.

== Anatomy ==
It refers to a thickening of connective tissue that covers the apex of each human lung. It is an extension of the endothoracic fascia that exists between the parietal pleura and the thoracic cage. Sibson muscular part is originated from scalenus minimus muscle. Fascial part is originated from Endothoracic Fascia. It attaches to the internal border of the first rib and the transverse processes of vertebra C7. It extends approximately an inch more superiorly than the superior thoracic aperture, because the lungs themselves extend higher than the top of the ribcage.

== Clinical significance ==
- The function of the suprapleural membrane is to protect the apex of the lung (as some of the part which extends outside the rib cage) and to protect the cervical fascia. This helps in resisting intrathoracic pressure changes therefore preventing inflation and deflation of the neck during expiration and inspiration respectively and also providing rigidity to the thoracic inlet.
- Herniation of the cervical fascia may result due to injury to suprapleural membrane.
  - "The thoracic duct traverses Sibson's Fascia of the thoracic-inlet up to the level of C7 before turning around and emptying into the left (major) duct. The right (minor duct) only traverses the thoracic inlet once."
