= Vestibule =

Vestibule or vestibulum may refer to:

== Architecture ==
- Vestibule (architecture), small room leading into a larger room
- Porch, room or gallery in front of a building's entrance

== Anatomy ==
- Aortic vestibule
- Laryngeal vestibule
- Nasal vestibule
- Vestibule of the ear
- Vulval vestibule
- Area of the human mouth between the lips and the teeth

== Other uses ==
- Dleskovec Plateau in northern Slovenia
- Covered area outside the opening of a tent

== See also ==
- Articulated bus or vestibule bus
- Vestibuled train
- Vestibule of Hell from Dante's Inferno
