= Pleural thickening =

- Other names: Pleural fibrosis
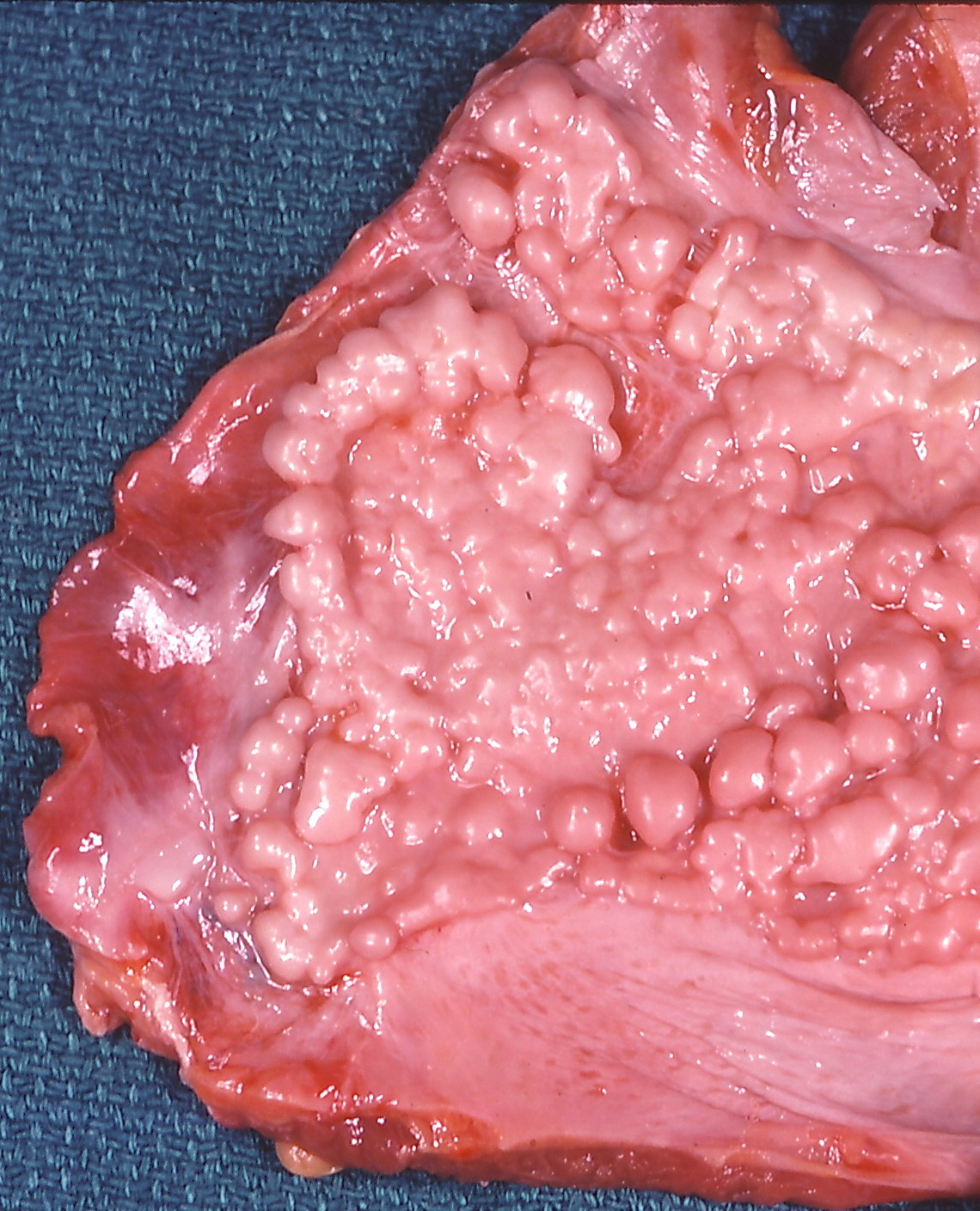
- Macroscopic appearance of a pleural plaque.
- Specialty: Respirology

Pleural thickening is an increase in the bulkiness of one or both of the pulmonary pleurae. A severe form of the condition is known as fibrothorax.

== Causes ==
Category	Disease	Features
Infection	After empyema	Most often basolateral; May have calcification; Non-progressive
Infection	After tuberculosis	Commonly forming an apical pleural cap; Non-progressive; Rarely extensive, with sheet-like calcifications
Infection	Active infection with mycobacteria other than tuberculosis, or chronic pulmonary aspergillosis	Slowly progressive; Apical distribution; Cavitations
Non-infectious inflammation	Asbestosis	Pleural plaques (see section below); Less common: Extensive confluent thickening, sometimes with pleural effusion
Non-infectious inflammation	After pleurodesis	Diffuse; Non-progressive
Non-infectious inflammation	After hemothorax	Usually basolateral distribution; May have calcification; Non-progressive
Non-infectious inflammation	After drugs, such as methysergide or bromocriptine	Diffuse; Possible interstitial pulmonary fibrosis
Cancer-related	Primary cancer, mainly mesothelioma	Associated with asbestosis; Progressive thickening
Cancer-related	Metastasis or invasion, mainly from lung cancer	Progressive; Nodular changes; Lung tumors

== Pleural plaques ==
Pleural plaques are patchy collections of hyalinized collagen in the parietal pleura. They have a holly leaf appearance on X-ray. They are indicators of asbestos exposure, and the most common asbestos-induced lesion. They usually appear after 20 years or more of exposure and never degenerate into mesothelioma. They appear as fibrous plaques on the parietal pleura, usually on both sides, and at the posterior and inferior part of the chest wall as well as the diaphragm.

== See also ==
- Pleural disease
