= Thoracic cavity =

Body cavity surrounded by the rib cage

- Lateral view of body cavities with thoracic cavity labeled at the right

Details

Identifiers
- Latin: cavitas thoracis, cavum thoracis
- MeSH: D035423
- TA98: A01.1.00.049; A02.3.04.002; A07.0.00.000
- TA2: 1097, 126
- FMA: 7565

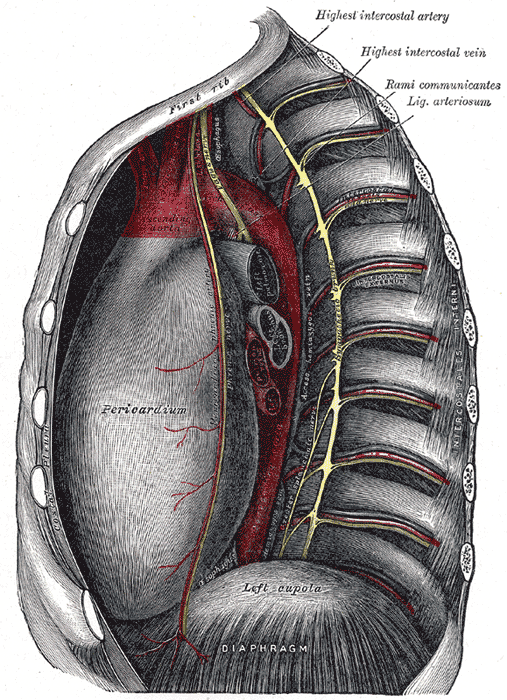
The picture displays the mediastinum on sagittal plane, thoracic diaphragm at the bottom, the heart (cor), behind sternum and ribs (to the left on the picture (this is the anterior/front) and to the right (posterior/back)), you have the thoracic vertebrae.

The thoracic cavity (or chest cavity) is the chamber of the body of vertebrates that is protected by the thoracic wall (rib cage and associated skin, muscle, and fascia). The central compartment of the thoracic cavity is the mediastinum. There are two openings of the thoracic cavity, a superior thoracic aperture known as the thoracic inlet and a lower inferior thoracic aperture known as the thoracic outlet.

The thoracic cavity includes the tendons as well as the cardiovascular system which could be damaged from injury to the back, spine or the neck.

== Structure ==
Structures within the thoracic cavity include:

- structures of the cardiovascular system, including the heart and great vessels, which include the thoracic aorta, the pulmonary artery and all its branches, the superior and inferior vena cava, the pulmonary veins, and the azygos vein
- structures of the respiratory system, including the diaphragm, trachea, bronchi and lungs
- structures of the digestive system, including the esophagus,
- endocrine glands, including the thymus gland,
- structures of the nervous system including the paired vagus nerves, and the paired sympathetic chains,
- lymphatics including the thoracic duct.

It contains three potential spaces lined with mesothelium: the paired pleural cavities and the pericardial cavity. The mediastinum comprises those organs which lie in the centre of the chest between the lungs. The cavity also contains two openings one at the top, the superior thoracic aperture also called the thoracic inlet, and a lower inferior thoracic aperture which is much larger than the inlet.

== Clinical significance ==
If the pleural cavity is breached from the outside, as by a bullet wound or knife wound, a pneumothorax, or air in the cavity, may result. If the volume of air is significant, one or both lungs may collapse, which requires immediate medical attention.

== Additional images ==
CT scan of the thorax (axial mediastinal window)

CT scan of the thorax (coronal lung window)

CT scan of the thorax (coronal mediastinal window)

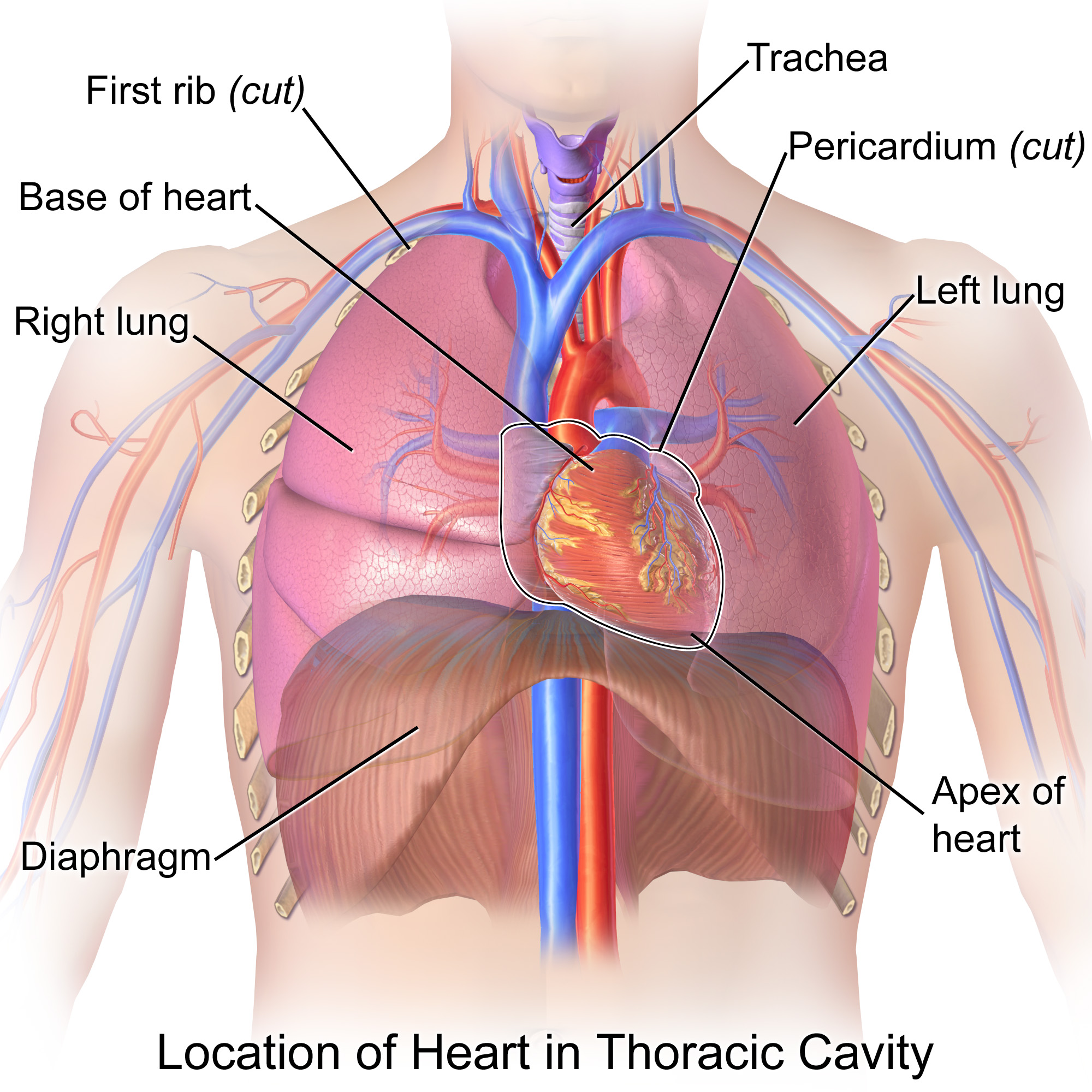
Illustration of heart in thoracic cavity

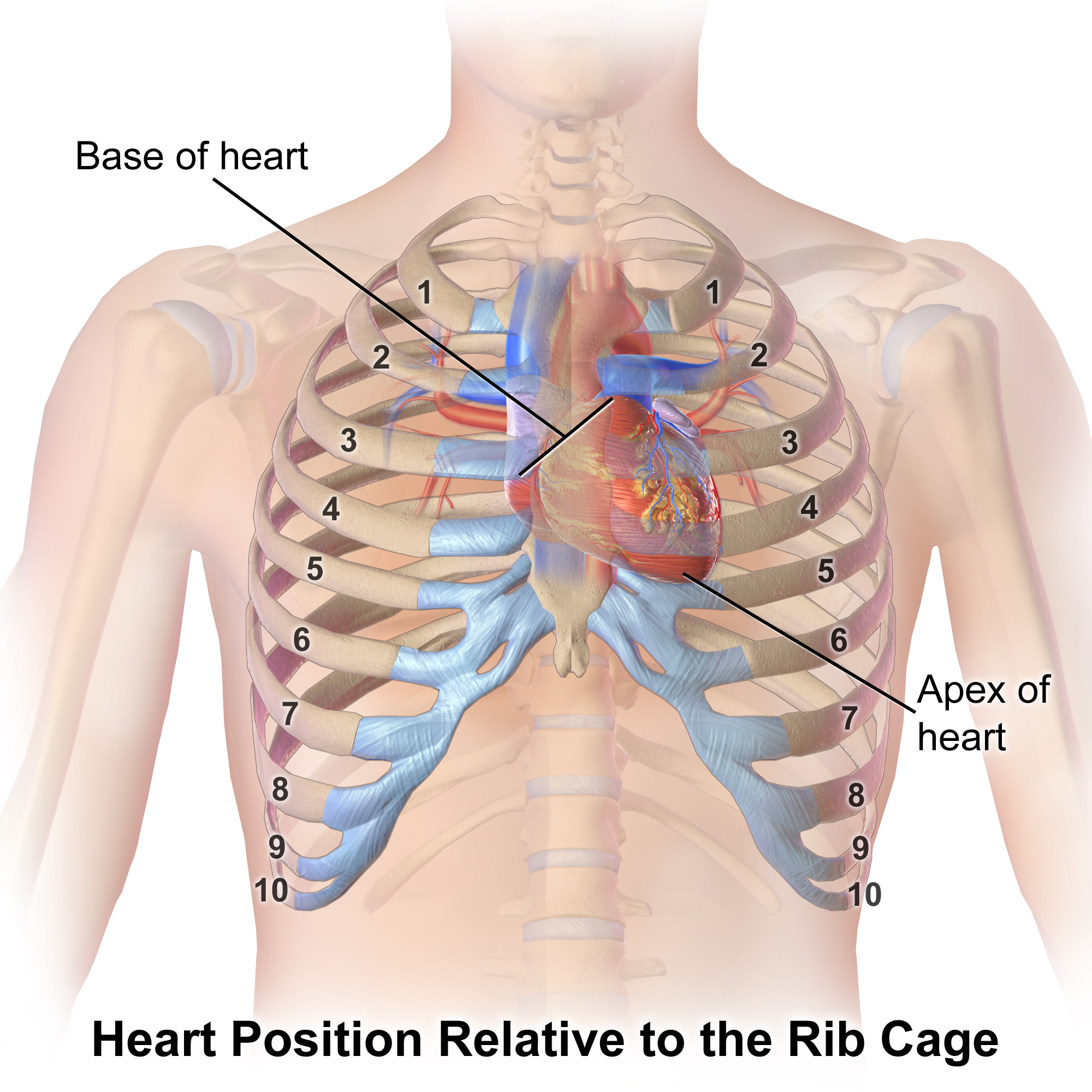
Illustration of heart position relative to the rib cage
