= Thomas Sibson =

Thomas Sibson (1817–1844) was an English artist.

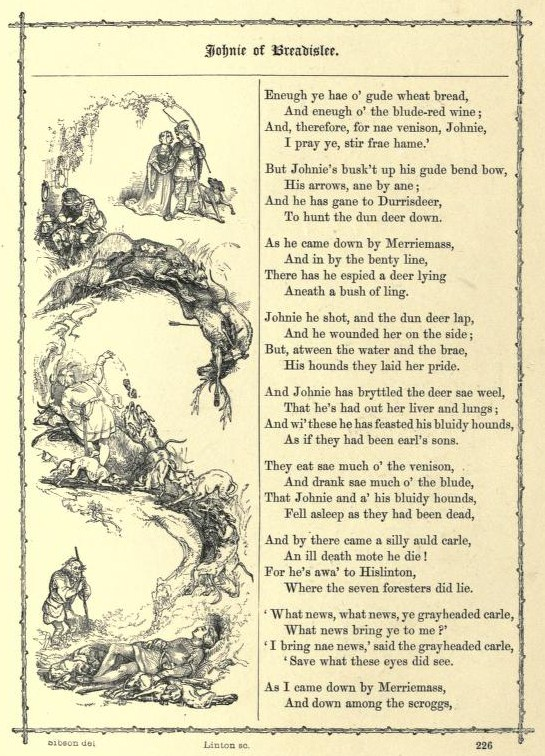
Illustration to The Book of British Ballads (1842), design by Thomas Sibson, engraving by William James Linton.

== Life ==
The son of Francis and Jane Sibson, and younger brother of Francis Sibson, Sibson was born in the parish of Cross Canonby, Cumberland, in March 1817. He started work in the counting-house of an uncle in Manchester. When he decided to become an artist, he came to London in 1838. Sibson went to Munich in September 1842 to study history painting from teacher Wilhelm von Kaulbach.

Sibson was suffering from tuberculosis, and was compelled by bad health to return home early in 1844. In the autumn he sailed for the Mediterranean, intending to winter in the south, but died at Malta on 28 November 1844.

== Works ==
In 1838 he published a pair of etchings, entitled The Anatomy of Happiness; these were followed by a series of plates of scenes in Charles Dickens's works, in a style described as "spidery Gothic". He subsequently designed many of the illustrations to Samuel Carter Hall's Book of Ballads, the Abbotsford edition of the Waverley novels, and other publications. An album containing sketches and studies made by Sibson before his visit to Munich, which passed at his death into the possession of his friend, William Bell Scott, was purchased at the sale of Bell's collections in 1890 by William James Linton, who presented it to the British Museum.
