= Lateral plate mesoderm =

Anatomical structure

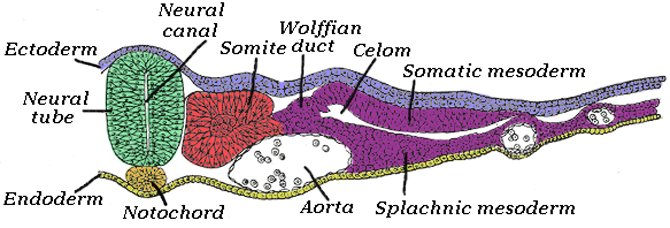
- Transverse section of a chick embryo of forty-five hours' incubation. * Axial mesoderm: yellow, at notochord. * Paraxial mesoderm: red, at somite. * Intermediate mesoderm: purple, near Wolffian duct. * Lateral plate mesoderm: purple, divided into "Somatic mesoderm" and "Splanchnic mesoderm".

- Diagram of vertebrate embryo showing divided lateral plate mesoderm forming the intraembryonic coelom. Somatic mesoderm at outer layer, splanchnic at inner layer.

Details
- Carnegie stage: 9
- Precursor: Mesoderm
- Gives rise to: Somatopleure, splanchnopleure

Identifiers
- Latin: mesoderma laminae lateralis
- TE: plate mesoderm_by_E5.0.3.0.0.0.2 E5.0.3.0.0.0.2

The lateral plate mesoderm is the mesoderm that is found at the periphery of the embryo. It is to the side of the paraxial mesoderm, and further to the axial mesoderm. The lateral plate mesoderm is separated from the paraxial mesoderm by a narrow region of intermediate mesoderm. The mesoderm is the middle layer of the three germ layers, between the outer ectoderm and inner endoderm.

During the third week of embryonic development the lateral plate mesoderm splits into two layers forming the intraembryonic coelom.

The outer layer of lateral plate mesoderm adheres to the ectoderm to become the somatic or parietal layer known as the somatopleure. The inner layer adheres to the endoderm to become the splanchnic or visceral layer known as the splanchnopleure.

== Development ==
The lateral plate mesoderm will split into two layers, the somatopleuric mesenchyme, and the splanchnopleuric mesenchyme.

- The somatopleuric layer forms the future body wall.
- The splanchnopleuric layer forms the circulatory system.

Spaces within the lateral plate are enclosed and forms the intraembryonic coelom.

It is formed by the secretion of BMP-4 by the ectoderm.

== Serosal mesoderms ==
Lateral plate mesoderm gives rise to the serosal mesoderms.

- forms a ventral layer associated with endoderm, the splanchnopleure. This forms the viscera and heart
- forms a dorsal layer associated with ectoderm, the somatopleure. This forms the body wall lining and dermis.
- Abdominal portion becomes contained in dorsal mesentery, part of the serosal mesoderm.
- When the two layers form, a cardiogenic plate is visible. Later, this will form the myocardial primordium, which will contribute to the tubular heart.

== Cavities ==
In the 4th week the coelom divides into pericardial, pleural and peritoneal cavities.

- First partition: is the septum transversum.

- This will be translocated later into the diaphragm and ventral mesentery.
- Divides the coelom into primitive pericardial and peritoneal cavities

- Pleuropericardial folds appear on the lateral wall of primitive pericardial cavity, which will eventually cause a partition to form the pericardial and pleural cavities.
- Communication between these partitions formed by the pericardioperitoneal canals. However, pleuroperitoneal membranes will grow to fuse with the septum transversum to close off these canals.

- At day 22, lung buds form, remaining ensheathed in a splanchnopleuric mesoderm

== Limb development ==
Cells from the lateral plate mesoderm and the myotome migrate to the limb field and proliferate to create the limb bud. The lateral plate cells produce the cartilaginous and skeletal portions of the limb while the myotome cells produce the muscle components. The lateral plate mesodermal cells secrete a fibroblast growth factor (FGF7 and FGF10, presumably) to induce the overlying ectoderm to form an important organizing structure called the apical ectodermal ridge (AER). The AER reciprocatively secretes FGF8 and FGF4 which maintains the FGF10 signal and induces proliferation in the mesoderm. The position of FGF10 expression is regulated by Wnt8c in the hindlimb and Wnt2b in the forelimb. The forelimb and the hindlimb are specified by their position along the anterior/posterior axis and possibly by two T-box containing transcription factors: Tbx5 and Tbx4, respectively.

== Additional images ==
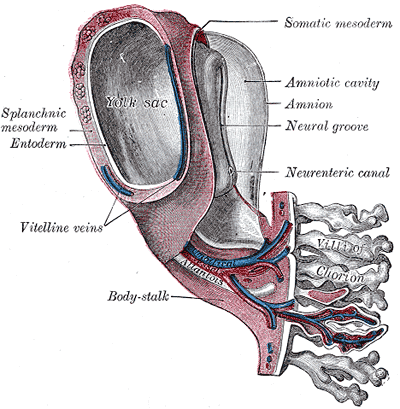
Model of human embryo 1.3 mm. long. (Splanchic mesoderm labeled at left, somatic mesoderm at top right

== See also ==
- List of human cell types derived from the germ layers
