= Right atrioventricular orifice =

Anatomical feature of the human heart

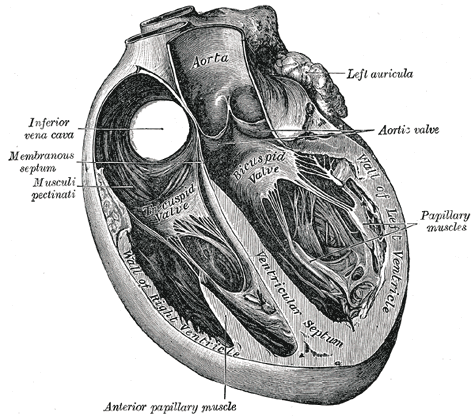
- Section of the heart showing the ventricular septum. (Right atrioventricular orifice visible at left, but not labeled.)

Details

Identifiers
- Latin: ostium atrioventriculare dextrum
- TA98: A12.1.02.002
- TA2: 3983
- FMA: 9274

The right atrioventricular orifice (right atrioventricular opening) is the large oval aperture of communication between the right atrium and ventricle in the heart.

Situated at the base of the atrium, it measures about 3.8 to 4 cm. in diameter and is surrounded by a fibrous ring, covered by the lining membrane of the heart; it is considerably larger than the corresponding aperture on the left side, being sufficient to admit the ends of four fingers.

It is guarded by the tricuspid valve.

== See also ==
- Left atrioventricular orifice
