= Somatopleure =

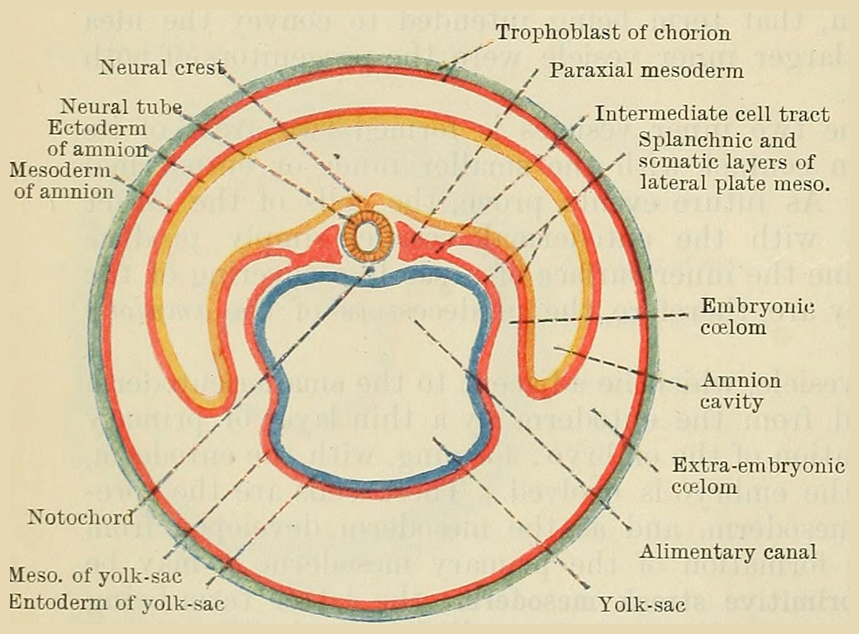
- Schematic transverse section of an embryo showing the lateral plate divisions of somatopleure and splanchnopleure

- Diagram of vertebrate embryo showing divided lateral plate mesoderm forming the intraembryonic coelom. Somatic mesoderm at outer layer, splanchnic at inner layer.

Details
- Carnegie stage: 9
- Precursor: Lateral plate mesoderm, ectoderm
- Gives rise to: Mesothelium

Identifiers
- Latin: mesenchyma somatopleurale
- TE: E4.0.4.1.0.0.3

The somatopleure is formed during embryonic development when the lateral plate mesoderm splits into two layers. The outer (or somatic) layer becomes applied to the inner surface of the ectoderm, and with it (partially) forms the somatopleure. The inner layer forms the splanchnopleure.

The somatopleure as the combination of ectoderm and mesoderm, forms the amnion, the chorion and the lateral body wall of the embryo. Limb formation, from the somatic mesoderm, is induced by hox genes and the expression of other molecules through an epithelial-mesenchyme transition. The embryonic somatopleure is then divided into 3 sections, the anterior limb bud formation, the posterior limb bud formation and the non limb forming wall. The bud forming sections grow in size. The somatic mesoderm under the ectoderm proliferates in mesenchyme form.

In the chicken, the extraembryonic tissues are separated into two layers: the splanchnopleure composed of the endoderm and splanchnic mesoderm, and the somatopleure composed of the ectoderm and somatic mesoderm along with the formation of the coelomic cavity after gastrulation. The amnion and chorion are derived from the somatopleure with a presumptive border of the ectamnion. Following the anterior extension of the extraembryonic mesoderm and formation of the coelom, the anterior and lateral amniotic folds arise along the ectamnion and grow posteriorly over the head of the embryo. A portion of the amniogenic somatopleure adjacent to the base of the head fold is identified as the region contributing to embryonic tissues in the thoracic wall and pharyngeal and cardiac regions. The somatopleure is known to serve as the matrix of the ventrolateral body wall and gives rise to connective tissue, tendons and the sternum.
