= Mesothelium =

Membrane lining body cavities

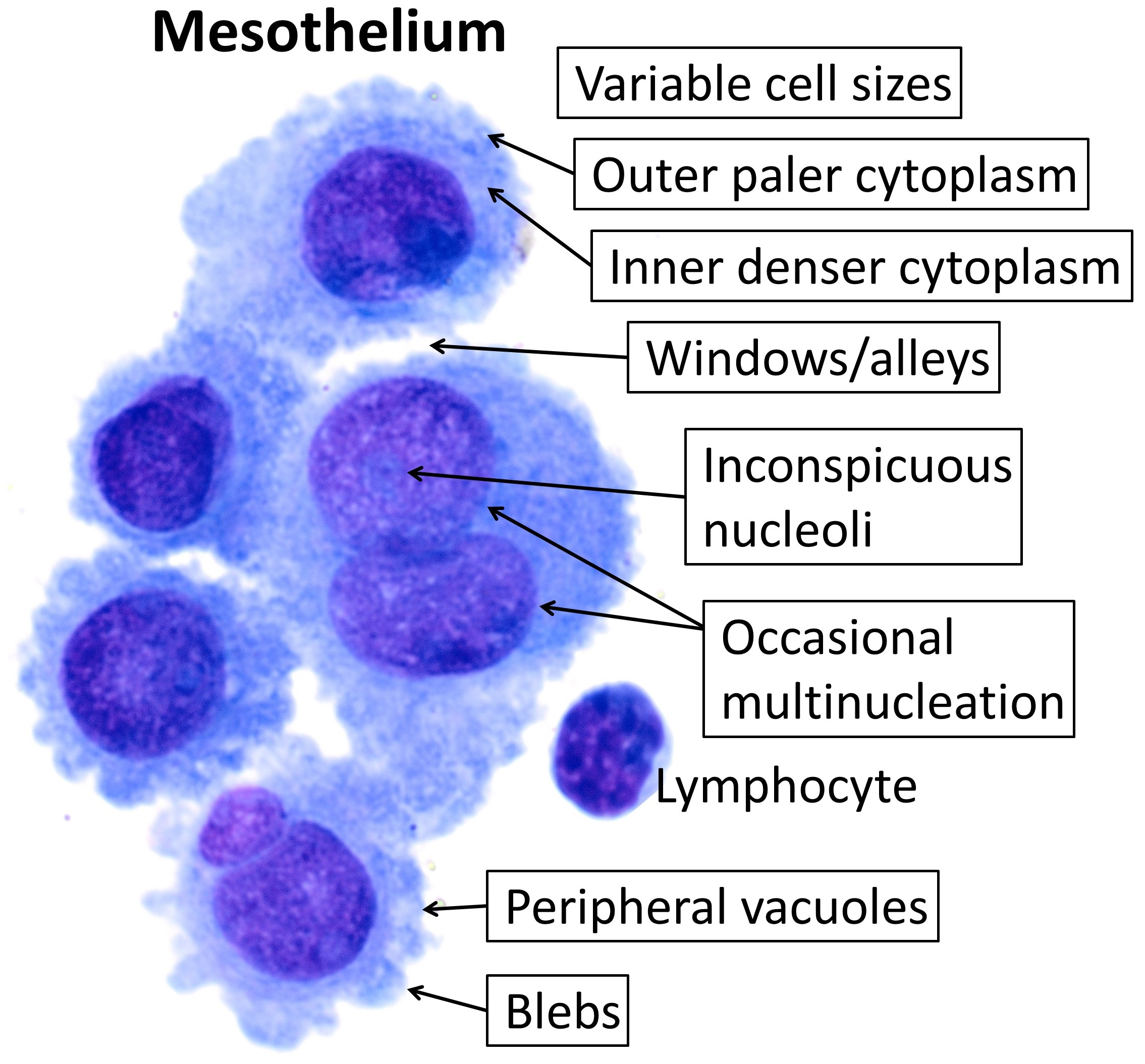
- Cytology of normal mesothelial cells, with typical features. Wright's stain

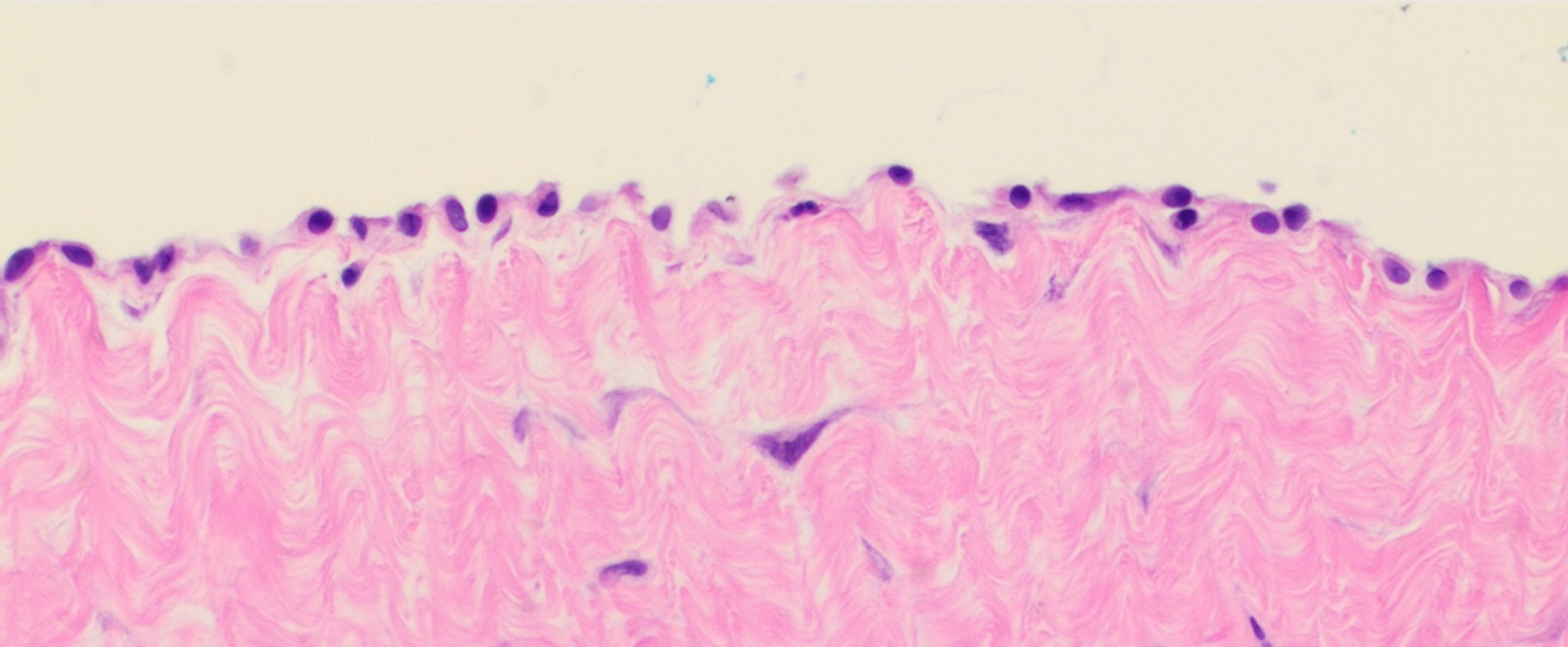
- Histology of a cross-section of the peritoneal mesothelial lining, and underlying fibrous tissue. H&E stain.

Details
- Precursor: Somatopleuric mesenchyme

Identifiers
- Latin: mesothelium
- TH: H2.00.02.0.02017, H3.04.08.0.00003
- FMA: 14074

The mesothelium is a membrane composed of simple squamous epithelial cells of mesodermal origin, which forms the lining of several body cavities: the pleura (pleural cavity around the lungs), peritoneum (abdominopelvic cavity including the mesentery, greater and lesser omentum, falciform ligament and the perimetrium) and pericardium (around the heart).

Mesothelial tissue also surrounds the male testis (as the tunica vaginalis) and occasionally the spermatic cord (in a patent processus vaginalis). Mesothelium that covers the internal organs is called visceral mesothelium, while one that covers the surrounding body walls is called the parietal mesothelium. The mesothelium that secretes serous fluid as a main function is also known as a serosa.

== Origin ==
Mesothelium derives from the embryonic mesoderm cell layer, that lines the coelom (body cavity) in the embryo. It develops into the layer of cells that covers and protects most of the internal organs of the body.

== Structure ==
The mesothelium forms a monolayer of flattened squamous-like epithelial cells resting on a thin basement membrane supported by dense irregular connective tissue. Cuboidal mesothelial cells may be found at areas of injury, the milky spots of the omentum, and the peritoneal side of the diaphragm overlaying the lymphatic lacunae. The luminal surface is covered with microvilli. The proteins and serosal fluid trapped by the microvilli provide a slippery surface for internal organs to slide past one another.

== Function ==
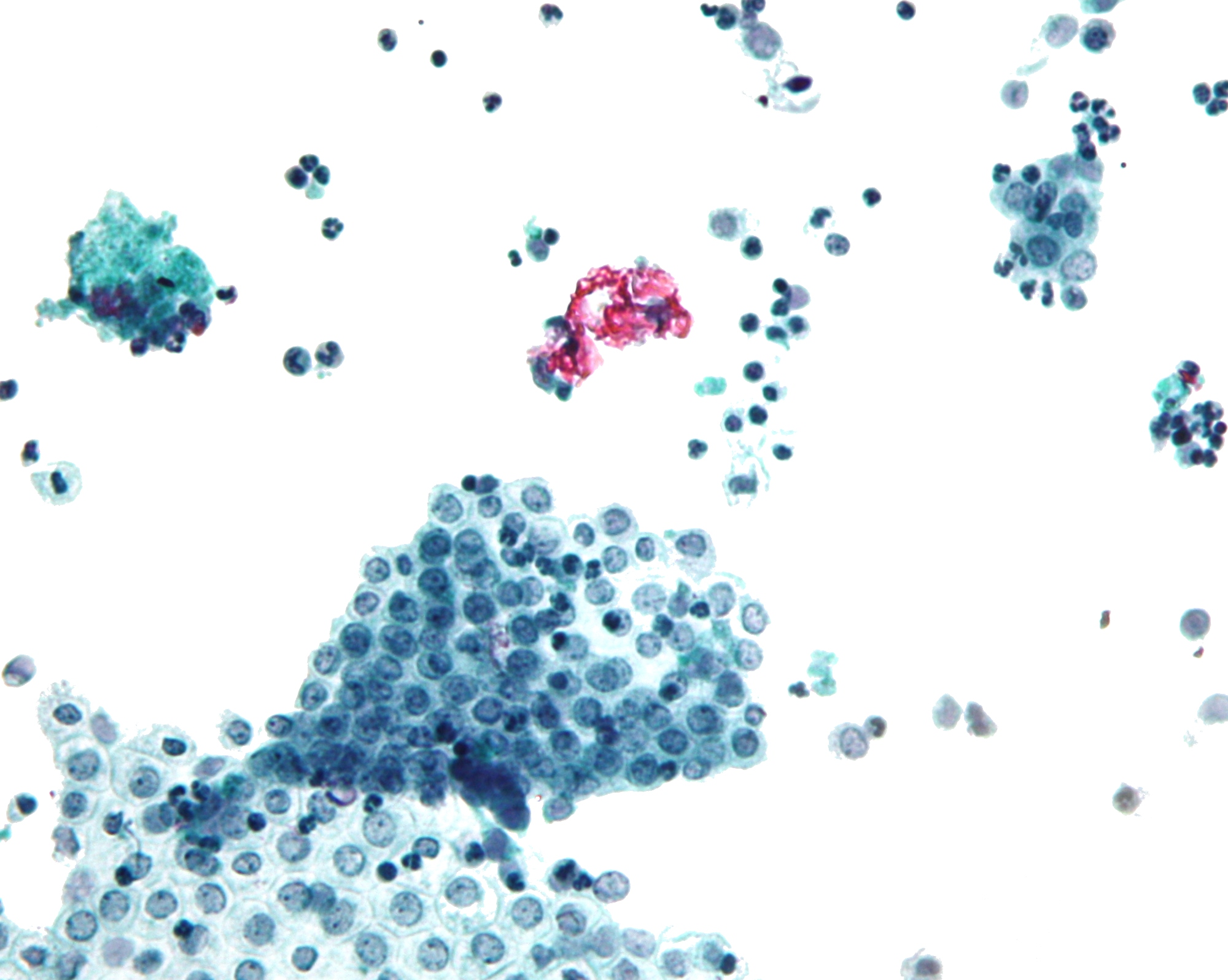
Micrograph of benign mesothelial cells. Peritoneal wash. Pap stain.

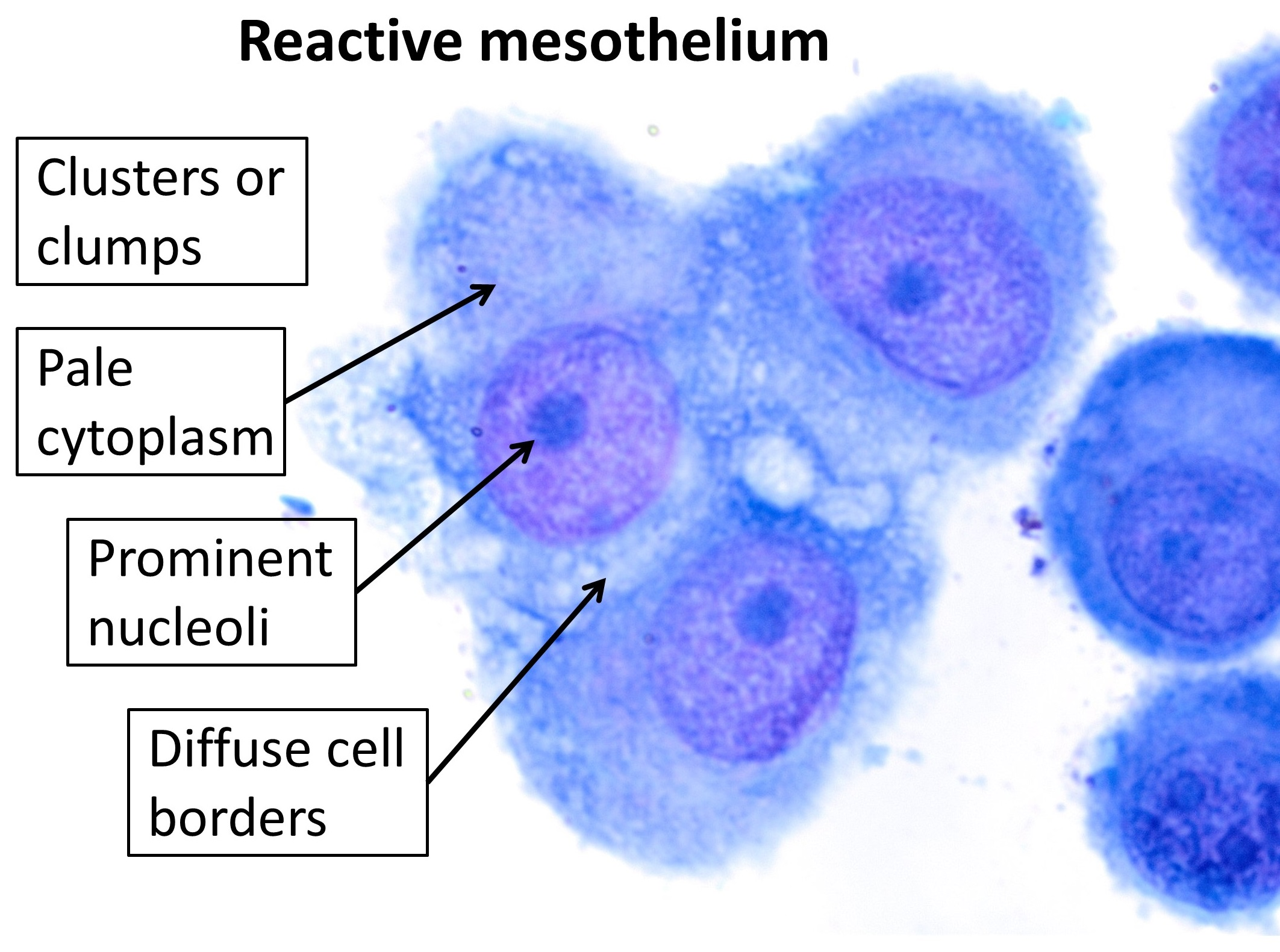
Cytology of reactive mesothelium, with typical features. The main causes of reactive mesothelium are infection, trauma and cancer. Wright's stain.

The mesothelium is composed of an extensive monolayer of specialized cells (mesothelial cells) that line the body's serous cavities and internal organs. The main purpose of these cells is to produce a lubricating fluid that is released between layers, providing a slippery, non-adhesive, and protective surface to facilitate intracoelomic movement.

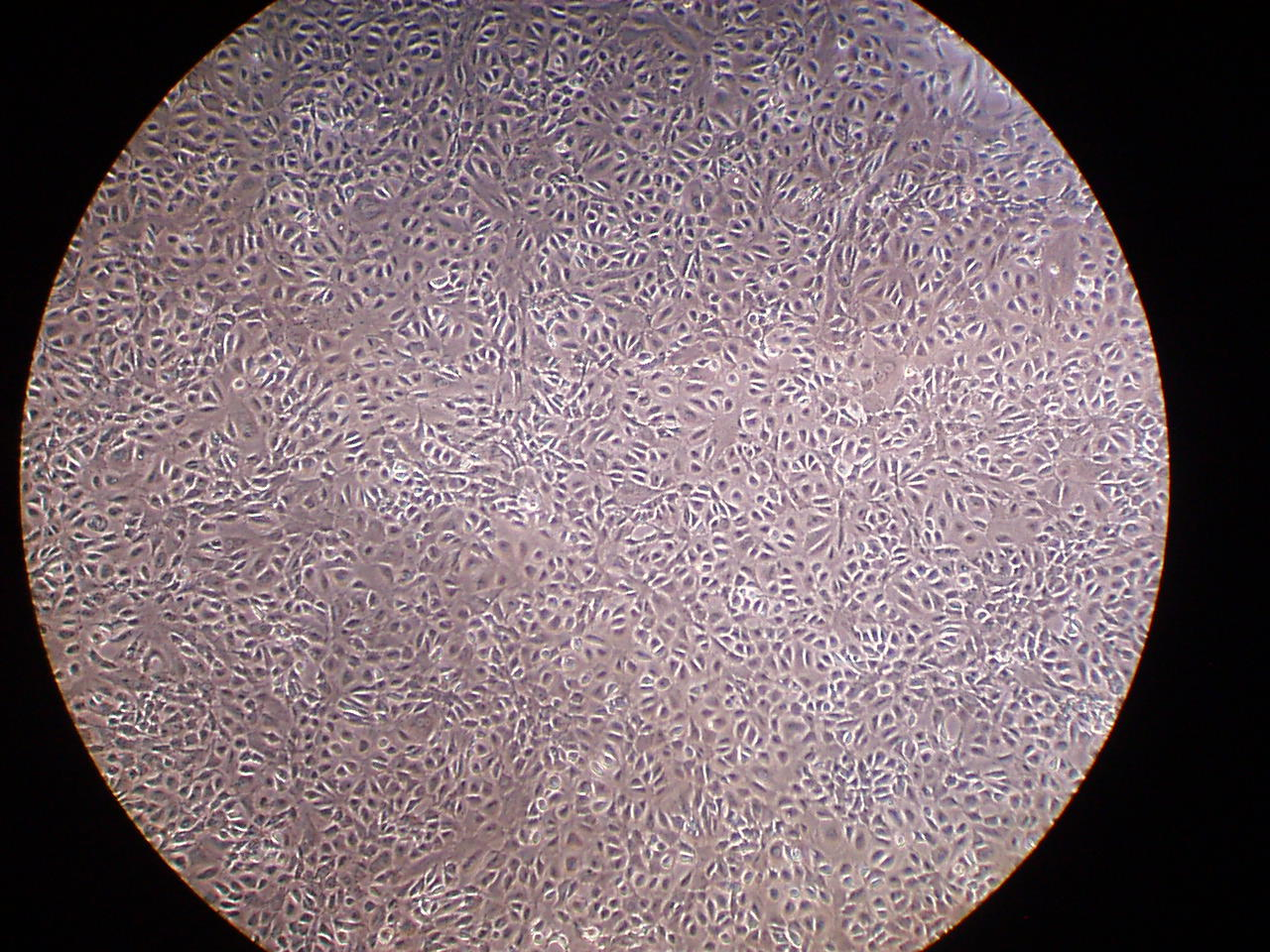
A layer of mesothelial cells grown in cell culture, featuring the typical "cobblestone" appearance.

The mesothelium is also implicated in the transport and movement of fluid and particulate matter across the serosal cavities, leukocyte migration in response to inflammatory mediators, synthesis of pro-inflammatory cytokines, growth factors, and extracellular matrix proteins to aid in serosal repair, and the release of factors to promote the disposition and clearance of fibrin (such as plasminogen). Mesothelial cells are capable of phagocytosis and are antigen-presenting cells. The secretion of glycosaminoglycans and lubricants may protect the body against infection and tumor dissemination.

== Role in disease ==
- Mesothelioma: (cancer of the mesothelium) is a disease in which cells of the mesothelium become abnormal and divide without control or order. They can invade and damage nearby tissues and organs. Cancer cells can also metastasize (spread) from their original site to other parts of the body. Most cases of mesothelioma begin in the pleura or peritoneum. More than 90% of mesothelioma cases are linked to asbestos exposure.
- Mesothelial hyperplasia
- Intra-abdominal adhesions: Normally, the mesothelium secretes plasminogen, which removes fibrin deposits. During surgical procedures, the mesothelium may be damaged. Its fibrinolytic capacity becomes insufficient and fibrin accumulates, causing fibrous adhesions between opposing surfaces. These adhesions cause intestinal obstruction and female infertility if it occurs in the abdomen, and may impair cardiac and lung function in the thorax.
- Ultrafiltration failure: The peritoneal mesothelium is implicated in the long-term development of ultrafiltration failure in peritoneal dialysis patients. The presence of supra-physiological glucose concentrations, acidity, and glucose degradation products in peritoneal dialysis fluids contribute to the fibrosis of the peritoneal mesothelium, either by epithelial–mesenchymal transition or increased proliferation of existing fibroblasts. A fibrosed peritoneum results in the increased passage of solutes across the peritoneum and ultrafiltration failure.

== See also ==
- Serous membrane
