= Aortic orifice =

Anatomical feature of the human heart

Details

Identifiers
- Latin: ostium aortae
- TA98: A12.1.04.010
- TA2: 3994
- FMA: 9350

The aortic orifice (aortic opening) is a circular opening, in front and to the right of the left atrioventricular orifice, from which it is separated by the anterior cusp of the bicuspid valve.

It is guarded by the aortic semilunar valve.

The portion of the ventricle immediately below the aortic orifice is termed the aortic vestibule, and has fibrous instead of muscular walls.
