= Left atrioventricular orifice =

Anatomical feature of the human heart

Details

Identifiers
- Latin: ostium atrioventriculare sinistrum
- TA98: A12.1.04.002
- TA2: 3988
- FMA: 9335

The left atrioventricular orifice (left atrioventricular opening or mitral orifice) is placed below and to the left of the aortic orifice.

It is a little smaller than the corresponding aperture of the opposite side.

It is surrounded by a dense fibrous ring, covered by the lining membrane of the heart, and is regarded as the bicuspid or mitral valve.
