= Pleural cavity =

Fluid-filled space between the lungs

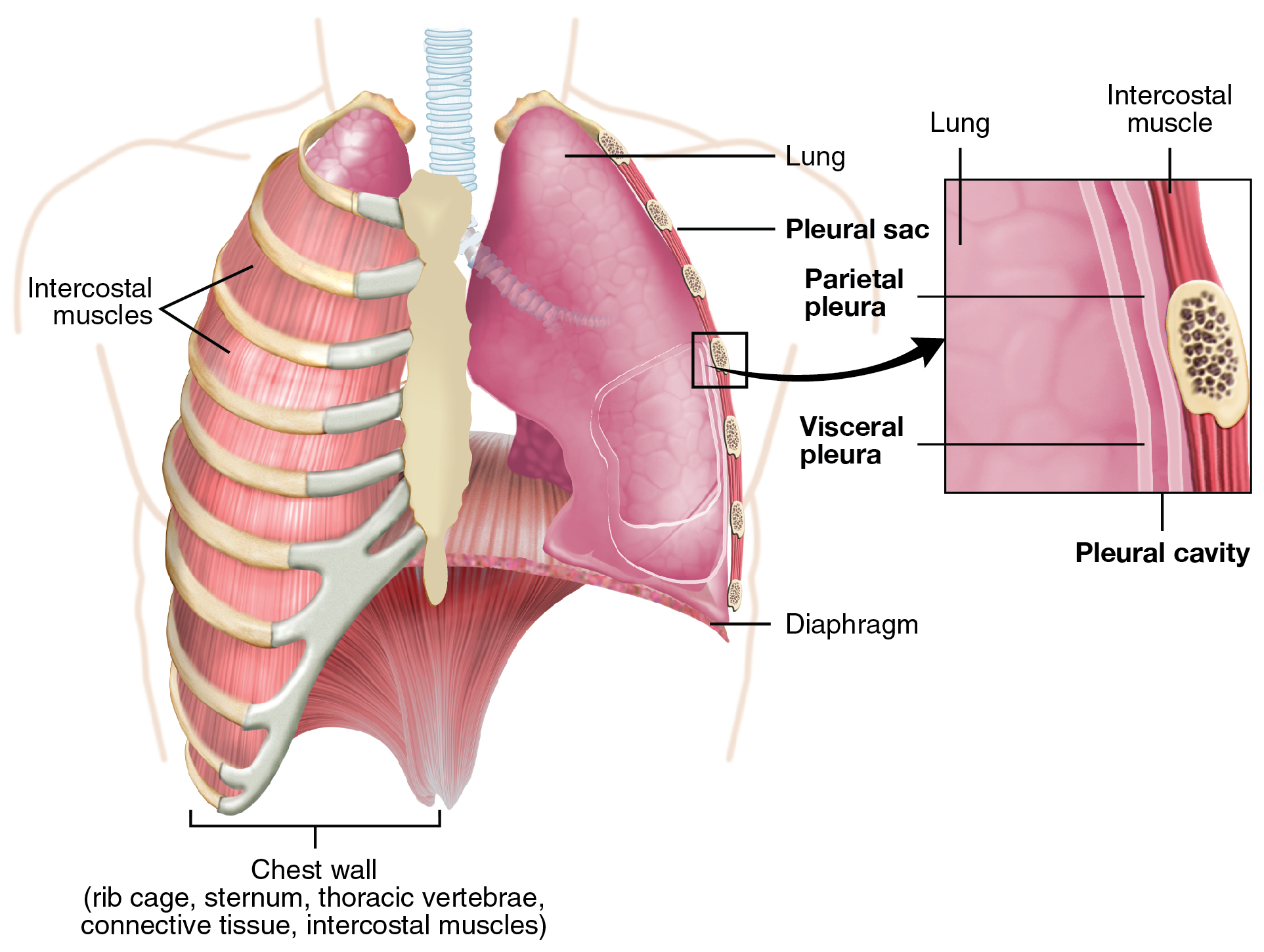
- The pleural cavity is the potential space between the pleurae of the pleural sac that surrounds each lung.

Details
- Precursor: Intraembryonic coelom

Identifiers
- Latin: cavum pleurae, cavum pleurale, cavitas pleuralis
- MeSH: D035422
- TA98: A07.1.01.001
- TA2: 3316
- TH: H3.05.03.0.00013
- FMA: 9740

The pleural cavity, or pleural space (or sometimes intrapleural space), is the potential space between the pleurae of the pleural sac that surrounds each lung. A small amount of serous pleural fluid is maintained in the pleural cavity to enable lubrication between the membranes, and also to create a pressure gradient.

The serous membrane that covers the surface of the lung is the visceral pleura and is separated from the outer membrane, the parietal pleura, by just the film of pleural fluid in the pleural cavity. The visceral pleura follows the fissures of the lung and the root of the lung structures. The parietal pleura is attached to the mediastinum, the upper surface of the diaphragm, and to the inside of the ribcage.

== Structure ==
In humans, the left and right lungs are completely separated by the mediastinum, and there is no communication between their pleural cavities. Therefore, in cases of a unilateral pneumothorax, the contralateral lung will remain functioning normally unless there is a tension pneumothorax, which may shift the mediastinum and the trachea, kink the great vessels, and eventually collapse the contralateral cardiopulmonary circulation.

The visceral pleura receives its blood supply from the parenchymal capillaries of the underlying lung, which have input from both the pulmonary and the bronchial circulation. The parietal pleura receives its blood supply from whatever structures underlie it, which can be branched from the aorta (intercostal, superior phrenic, and inferior phrenic arteries), the internal thoracic (pericardiacophrenic, anterior intercostal, and musculophrenic branches), or their anastomosis.

The visceral pleurae are innervated by splanchnic nerves from the pulmonary plexus, which also innervates the lungs and bronchi. The parietal pleurae however, like their blood supplies, receive nerve supplies from different sources. The costal pleurae (including the portion that bulges above the thoracic inlet) and the periphery of the diaphragmatic pleurae are innervated by the intercostal nerves from the enclosing rib cage, which branches off from the T1-T12 thoracic spinal cord. The mediastinal pleurae and central portions of the diaphragmatic pleurae are innervated by the phrenic nerves. which branches off the C3-C5 cervical cord. Only the parietal pleurae contain somatosensory nerves and are capable of perceiving pain.

=== Development ===
During the third week of embryogenesis, each lateral mesoderm splits into two layers. The dorsal layer joins the overlying somites and ectoderm to form the somatopleure; and the ventral layer joins the underlying endoderm to form the splanchnopleure. The dehiscence of these two layers creates a fluid-filled cavity on each side, and with the ventral infolding and the subsequent midline fusion of the trilaminar disc, forms a pair of intraembryonic coeloms anterolaterally around the gut tube during the fourth week, with the splanchnopleure on the inner cavity wall and the somatopleure on the outer cavity wall.

The cranial end of the intraembryonic coeloms fuse early to form a single cavity, which rotates invertedly and apparently descends in front of the thorax, and is later encroached by the growing primordial heart as the pericardial cavity. The caudal portions of the coeloms fuse later below the umbilical vein to become the larger peritoneal cavity, separated from the pericardial cavity by the transverse septum. The two cavities communicate via a slim pair of remnant coeloms adjacent to the upper foregut called the pericardioperitoneal canal. During the fifth week, the developing lung buds begin to invaginate into these canals, creating a pair of enlarging cavities that encroach into the surrounding somites and further displace the transverse septum caudally — namely the pleural cavities. The mesothelia pushed out by the developing lungs arise from the splanchnopleure, and become the visceral pleurae; while the other mesothelial surfaces of the pleural cavities arise from the somatopleure, and become the parietal pleurae.

The tissue separating the newly formed pleural cavities from the pericardial cavity are known as the pericardiopleural membranes, which later become the side walls of the fibrous pericardium. The transverse septum and the displaced somites fuse to form the pleuroperitoneal membranes, which separates the pleural cavities from the peritoneal cavity and later becomes the diaphragm.

== Function ==
The pleural cavity, with its associated pleurae, aids optimal functioning of the lungs during breathing. The pleural cavity also contains pleural fluid, which acts as a lubricant and allows the pleurae to slide effortlessly against each other during respiratory movements. Surface tension of the pleural fluid also leads to close apposition of the lung surfaces with the chest wall. This relationship allows for greater inflation of the alveoli during breathing. The pleural cavity transmits movements of the ribs muscles to the lungs, particularly during heavy breathing. During inhalation the external intercostals contract, as does the diaphragm. This causes the expansion of the chest wall, that increases the volume of the lungs. A negative pressure is thus created and inhalation occurs.

=== Pleural fluid ===
Pleural fluid is a serous fluid produced by the serous membrane covering normal pleurae. Most fluid is produced by the exudation in parietal circulation (intercostal arteries) via bulk flow and reabsorbed by the lymphatic system. Thus, pleural fluid is produced and reabsorbed continuously. The composition and volume is regulated by mesothelial cells in the pleura. In a normal 70 kg human, a few milliliters of pleural fluid is always present within the intrapleural space. Larger quantities of fluid can accumulate in the pleural space only when the rate of production exceeds the rate of reabsorption. Normally, the rate of reabsorption increases as a physiological response to accumulating fluid, with the reabsorption rate increasing up to 40 times the normal rate before significant amounts of fluid accumulate within the pleural space. Thus, a profound increase in the production of pleural fluid—or some blocking of the reabsorbing lymphatic system—is required for fluid to accumulate in the pleural space.

== Pleural fluid circulation ==
The hydrostatic equilibrium model, viscous flow model and capillary equilibrium model are the three hypothesised models of circulation of pleural fluid.

According to the viscous flow model, the intra pleural pressure gradient drives a downward viscous flow of pleural fluid along the flat surfaces of ribs. The capillary equilibrium model states that the high negative apical pleural pressure leads to a basal-to-apical gradient at the mediastinal pleural surface, leading to a fluid flow directed up toward the apex (helped by the beating heart and ventilation in lungs). Thus the recirculation of fluid occurs. Finally there is a traverse flow from margins to flat portion of ribs completes the fluid circulation.

Absorption occurs into lymphatic vessels at the level of the diaphragmatic pleura.

== Clinical significance ==
=== Pleural effusion ===
A pleural effusion can form when fluid builds up in the pleural cavity (labelled as pleural space).

A pathologic collection of pleural fluid is called a pleural effusion. Mechanisms:

1. Lymphatic obstruction
2. Increased capillary permeability
3. Decreased plasma colloid osmotic pressure
4. Increased capillary venous pressure
5. Increased negative intrapleural pressure

Pleural effusions are classified as exudative (high protein) or transudative (low protein). Exudative pleural effusions are generally caused by infections such as pneumonia (parapneumonic pleural effusion), malignancy, granulomatous disease such as tuberculosis or coccidioidomycosis, collagen vascular diseases, and other inflammatory states. Transudative pleural effusions occur in congestive heart failure (CHF), cirrhosis, or nephrotic syndrome.

Localized pleural fluid effusion noted during pulmonary embolism (PE) results probably from increased capillary permeability due to cytokine or inflammatory mediator release from the platelet-rich thrombi.

Transudate	Exudative causes
Congestive heart failure (CHF); Hepatic cirrhosis; Hypoproteinemia; Nephrotic syndrome; Pulmonary atelectasis; Myxedema; Peritoneal dialysis; Pulmonary embolism; Meigs's syndrome; Obstructive uropathy	Malignancy; Infection; Trauma; Pulmonary infarction; Pulmonary embolism; Autoimmune diseases; Pancreatitis; Ruptured esophagus (or Boerhaave syndrome)

=== Pleural fluid analysis ===
When accumulation of pleural fluid is noted, cytopathologic evaluation of the fluid, as well as clinical microscopy, microbiology, chemical studies, tumor markers, pH determination and other more esoteric tests are required as diagnostic tools for determining the causes of this abnormal accumulation. Even the gross appearance, color, clarity, and odor can be useful tools in diagnosis. The presence of heart failure, infection, or malignancy within the pleural cavity are the most common causes that can be identified using this approach.

==== Gross appearance ====
- Clear straw-colored: If transudative, no further analysis needed. If exudative, additional studies needed to determine cause (cytology, culture, biopsy).
- Cloudy, purulent, turbid: Infection, empyema, pancreatitis, malignancy.
- Pink to red/bloody: Traumatic tap, malignancy, pulmonary infarction, intestinal infarction, pancreatitis, trauma.
- Green-white, turbid: Rheumatoid arthritis with pleural effusion.
- Green-brown: Biliary disease, bowel perforation with ascites.
- Milky-white or yellow and bloody: Chylous effusion.
- Milky or green, metallic sheen: Pseudochylous effusion.
- Viscous (hemorrhagic or clear): Mesothelioma.
- Anchovy-paste (or 'chocolate sauce'): Ruptured amoebic liver abscess.

==== Microscopic appearance ====
Microscopy may show resident cells (mesothelial cells, inflammatory cells) of either benign or malignant etiology. Evaluation by a cytopathologist is then performed and a morphologic diagnosis can be made. Neutrophils are numerous in pleural empyema. If lymphocytes predominate and mesothelial cells are rare, this is suggestive of tuberculosis. Mesothelial cells may also be decreased in cases of rheumatoid pleuritis or post-pleurodesis pleuritis. Eosinophils are often seen if a patient has recently undergone prior pleural fluid tap. Their significance is limited.

If malignant cells are present, a pathologist may perform additional studies including immunohistochemistry to determine the etiology of the malignancy.

==== Chemical analysis ====
Chemistry studies may be performed including pH, pleural fluid:serum protein ratio, LDH ratio, specific gravity, cholesterol level, and bilirubin level. These studies may help clarify the etiology of a pleural effusion (exudative vs transudative). Amylase may be elevated in pleural effusions related to gastric/esophageal perforations, pancreatitis, or malignancy. Pleural effusions are classified as exudative (high protein) or transudative (low protein).

In spite of all the diagnostic tests available today, many pleural effusions remain idiopathic in origin. If severe symptoms persist, more invasive techniques may be required. In spite of the lack of knowledge of the cause of the effusion, treatment may be required to relieve the most common symptom, dyspnea, as this can be quite disabling. Thoracoscopy has become the mainstay of invasive procedures as closed pleural biopsy has fallen into disuse.

=== Disease ===
Diseases of the pleural cavity include:

- Pneumothorax: a collection of air within the pleural cavity
- Pleural effusion: a fluid accumulation within the pleural space
- Pleural tumors: abnormal growths on the pleurae
- Pleural metastases: metastases from a distant tumor that spread towards the pleural cavity.
- Tumor-like disorders of the lung pleura

== See also ==
- Coin test, medical diagnostic test for a punctured lung

== Sources ==
- Light, Richard W. (2007). Pleural Diseases. Lippincott Williams & Wilkins. ISBN 978-0781769570.
