= Francis Sibson =

English physician and anatomist

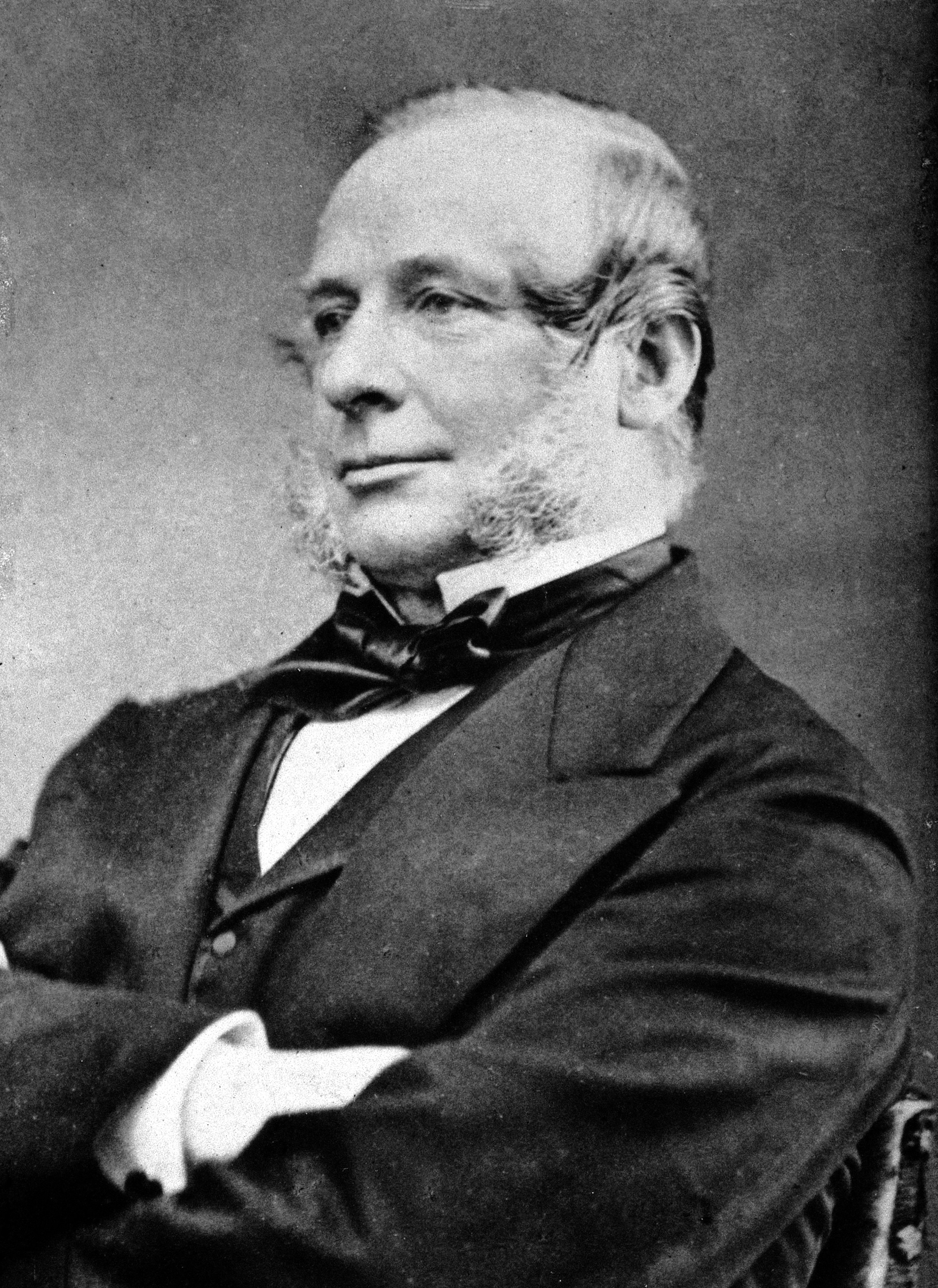
Francis Sibson

Francis Sibson FRS (21 May 1814 – 7 September 1876) was an English physician and anatomist.

== Early life ==
He was born at Crosscanonby, near Maryport, Cumberland but grew up and was educated in Edinburgh, apprenticed to John Lizars, surgeon and anatomist, receiving his diploma (LRCS) in 1831. He treated cholera patients during the 1831–32 epidemic.

He continued his studies at Guy's and St Thomas's Hospital, London, qualifying licentiate of the Society of Apothecaries (LSA) in 1835. He accepted the post as resident surgeon and apothecary to the Nottingham General Hospital. In 1848 he returned to London and graduated MB and MD in the same year. He was elected a Fellow of the Royal Society in 1849.

== Career ==
In 1851 he was appointed physician at St Mary's Hospital and lecturer at the medical school. Sibson was concerned to exhibit the internal organs of the human body in both healthy and diseased states: he was particularly interested in the physiology and pathology of the respiratory organs.

In 1862 he was appointed president of the Medical Society of London; from 1866 to 1869 Sibson served as president of the British Medical Association Council, and then later as vice-president for life.

He delivered the Goulstonian Lecture (1854), the Croonian Lecture (1870) and the Lumleian Lectures (1874) to the Royal College of Physicians

== Private life ==
He married Sarah Mary Ouvry (1822–1898) in 1858. He died suddenly whilst on holiday at Geneva.

Suprapleural membrane is also known as "Sibson's fascia".

== Death ==
He died at the Hôtel des Bergues, Geneva, on 7 September 1876.

== Publications ==
- Medical Anatomy, or, Illustrations of the Relevant Position and Movements of the Internal Organs (London, 1869)
- The Nomenclature of Diseases, drawn up by a Joint Committee appointed by the Royal College of Physicians (London, 1869)
- Collected Works of Francis Sibson, W.M. Ord (ed.) (London, 1881)
