= Intraembryonic coelom =

Details
- Days: 23
- Precursor: Lateral plate mesoderm
- Gives rise to: Pericardial cavity, pleural cavity, peritoneal cavity

Identifiers
- Latin: coeloma intraembryonicum
- TE: coelom_by_E5.8.0.0.2.0.1 E5.8.0.0.2.0.1

The intraembryonic coelom or embryonic body cavity is formed during the third week of human embryonic development. The earliest stage of this shows as coelomic spaces in the lateral mesoderm and cardiogenic mesoderm, which gradually join up to form one horseshoe-shaped intraembryonic cavity. The coelom divides the lateral plate mesoderm into two layers – a somatic parietal layer, and a splanchnic visceral layer.

The somatic layer of lateral mesoderm lies just beneath the ectodermal epithelium which is continuous with the extra embryonic mesoderm that covers the amnion. The somatic mesoderm and overlying ectoderm form the somatopleure, the embryonic body wall.

The splanchnic layer of lateral mesoderm is next to the endoderm which is continuous with the extrembryonic mesoderm that covers the yolk sac (umbilical vesicle). The splanchnic mesoderm and underlying embryonic endoderm form the splanchnopleure, the embryonic gut.

The bend in the horseshoe-shaped coelom at the cranial part is the site of the future pericardial cavity. The two lateral extensions indicate the future pleural cavities, and the peritoneal cavity. The distal parts of each lateral extension are continuous with the extraembryonic coelom. The intraembryonic coelom becomes the embryonic body cavity that in the fourth week of development will divide into the three cavities.
