= Splanchnopleure =

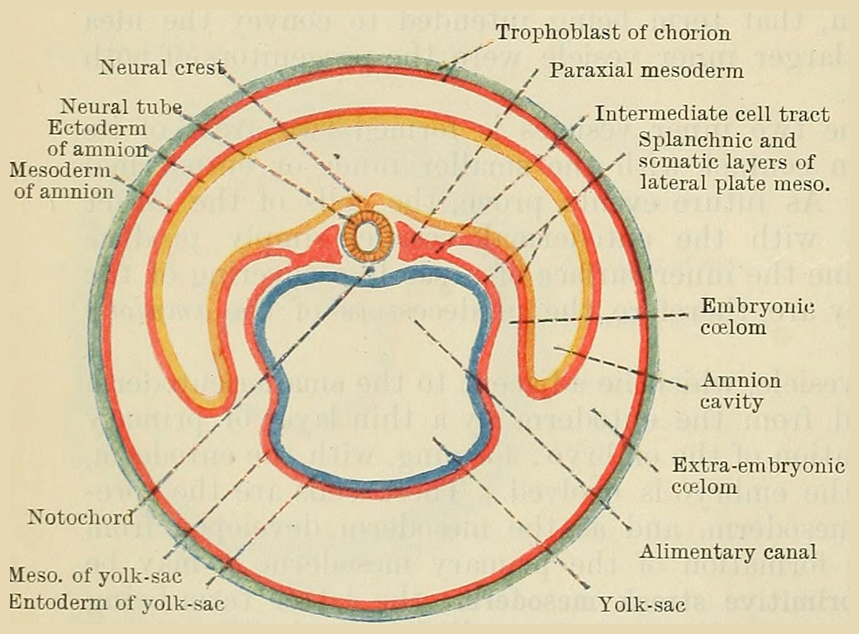
- Schematic transverse section of an embryo showing the lateral plate divisions of somatopleure and splanchnopleure

Details
- Carnegie stage: 9
- Precursor: Lateral plate mesoderm, endoderm
- Gives rise to: Mesenchyme

Identifiers
- Latin: mesenchyma splanchnopleurale
- TE: E4.0.4.1.0.0.4

The splanchnopleure is a structure formed during embryogenesis when the lateral plate mesoderm splits into two layers. The inner (or splanchnic) layer adheres to the endoderm, and with it forms the splanchnopleure (mesoderm external to the coelom plus the endoderm).

== See also ==
- somatopleure
- mesenchyme
