= Hemothorax =

Blood accumulation in the pleural cavity

- Other names: Haemothorax; Hæmothorax; Haemorrhagic pleural effusion
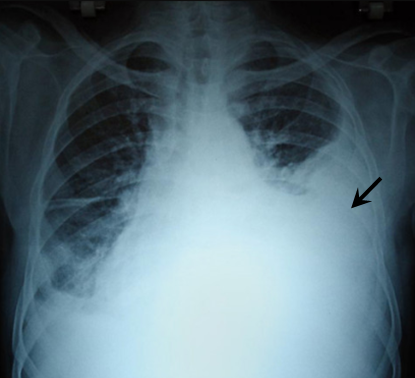
- Chest X-ray showing left sided hemothorax (arrowed)
- Specialty: Pulmonology
- Symptoms: Chest pain Difficulty breathing
- Complications: Empyema; Fibrothorax
- Types: Traumatic; Spontaneous
- Causes: Trauma; Cancer; Endometriosis
- Diagnostic method: Chest X-ray; Ultrasound; CT scan MRI; Thoracentesis
- Treatment: Tube thoracostomy Thoracotomy; Fibrinolytic therapy
- Medication: Streptokinase; Urokinase
- Prognosis: Favorable with treatment
- Frequency: 300,000 cases in the US per year

A hemothorax (derived from hemo- [blood] + thorax [chest], plural hemothoraces) is an accumulation of blood within the pleural cavity. The symptoms of a hemothorax may include chest pain and difficulty breathing, while the clinical signs may include reduced breath sounds on the affected side and a rapid heart rate. Hemothoraces are usually caused by an injury, but they may occur spontaneously due to cancer invading the pleural cavity, as a result of a blood clotting disorder, as an unusual manifestation of endometriosis, in response to pneumothorax, or rarely in association with other conditions.

Hemothoraces are usually diagnosed using a chest X-ray, but they can be identified using other forms of imaging including ultrasound, a CT scan, or an MRI. They can be differentiated from other forms of fluid within the pleural cavity by analysing a sample of the fluid, and are defined as having a hematocrit of greater than 50% that of the person's blood. Hemothoraces may be treated by draining the blood using a chest tube. Surgery may be required if the bleeding continues. If treated, the prognosis is usually good. Complications of a hemothorax include infection within the pleural cavity and the formation of scar tissue.

== Background ==
The lungs are surrounded by two layers of tissue called the pulmonary pleurae. In most healthy people, these two layers are tightly apposed, separated only by a small amount of pleural fluid. In certain disease states, the space between these two layers, called the pleural cavity, swells with fluid. This accumulation of fluid in the pleural cavity is called pleural effusion. Pleural effusions are given specific names depending on the nature of the fluid: hydrothorax for serous fluid, pyothorax for pus, hemothorax for blood, and urinothorax for urine.

== Signs and symptoms ==
Signs and symptoms include anxiety, rapid breathing, restlessness, shock, and pale, cool, clammy skin. When the affected area is percussed, a dull feeling may be observed. Neck veins may be flat and breathing sounds reduced. It can also cause a collapsed lung (atelectasis). Massive hemothorax, often defined as over 1.5 liters of blood initially when an intercostal drain is placed, or a bleeding rate greater than 200ml per hour, can result in shock with two causes: massive bleeding resulting from hypovolemic shock, and venous pressure from the retained blood, impairing blood flow.

== Causes ==
Hemothoraces are classified in three broad categories according to the cause and in order of frequency: traumatic, iatrogenic, or nontraumatic. All three categories have the potential to affect major arteries and result in death by blood loss.

=== Traumatic ===
Hemothorax is most often caused by blunt or penetrating trauma to the chest. In blunt traumatic cases, hemothorax typically occurs when rib fracture damages the intercostal vessels or the intraparenchymal pulmonary vessel, while in penetrating trauma, hemothorax occurs due to injuries directly affecting blood vessels in the thoracic wall, lung parenchyma, or the heart. If large blood vessels such as the aorta are damaged, the blood loss can be massive. Minor chest trauma can cause hemothorax when the blood's ability to clot is diminished as result either of anticoagulant medications or when there are bleeding disorders such as hemophilia.

=== Iatrogenic ===
Iatrogenic hemothorax can occur as a complication of heart and lung surgery, for example the rupture of lung arteries caused by the placement of catheters, thoracotomy, thoracostomy, or thoracentesis. The most common iatrogenic causes include subclavian venous catheterizations and chest tube placements, with an occurrence rate of around 1%. Sometimes, a Swan-Ganz catheter causes rupture of the pulmonary artery, causing a massive hemothorax. It can also be caused by other procedures like pleural, lung, or transbronchial biopsies, CPR, Nuss procedure, or endoscopic treatment of esophageal varices. Iatrogenic hemothorax is more common in people who have chronic kidney disease in the intensive care unit.

=== Nontraumatic ===
Less frequently, hemothoraces may occur spontaneously. Nontraumatic hemothoraces most frequently occur as a complication of some forms of cancer if the tumour invades the pleural space. Cancers responsible for hemothoraces include angiosarcomas, schwannomas, mesothelioma, thymomas, germ cell tumours, and lung cancer. Significant hemothoraces can occur with spontaneous rupture of small vessels when the blood's ability to clot is diminished as result of anticoagulant medications. In cases caused by anticoagulant therapy, the hemothorax becomes noticeable 4–7 days after anticoagulant therapy is started. In cases of hemothorax complicating pulmonary embolism treatment, the hemothorax is usually on the side of the original embolism. Those with an abnormal accumulation of air within the pleural space (a pneumothorax) can bleed into the cavity, which occurs in about 5% of cases of spontaneous pneumothorax, especially when lung bullae rupture. The resulting combination of air and blood within the pleural space is known as a hemopneumothorax. Bone growth in exostosis can create sharp edges, which can result in hemothorax by damaging adjacent arteries. It can occur postpartum due to the change in thoracic pressure during labor.

==== Vascular ====
Vascular causes of hemothorax include rupture of the descending aorta, in which case it initially involves the left pleural and mediastinal area due to the close vicinity of the pleural cavity. Rarely, a rupture of the thoracic aorta can result in a hemothorax, but the bleeding usually occurs in the pericardial space. Spontaneous tearing of blood vessels is more likely to occur in those with disorders that weaken blood vessels such as some forms of Ehlers–Danlos syndrome, disorders that lead to malformed blood vessels as seen in Rendu–Osler–Weber syndrome, or in bleeding disorders such as hemophilia and Glanzmann's thrombasthenia. Other rare causes of hemothorax include neurofibromatosis type 1 and extramedullary hematopoiesis.

==== Catamenial ====
Rarely, hemothoraces can arise due to extrapelvic endometriosis, a condition in which tissue similar to the lining that normally covers the inside of the uterus forms in unusual locations outside the pelvis. Endometriotic tissue that implants on the pleural surface can bleed in response to the hormonal changes of the menstrual cycle, causing what is known as a catamenial hemothorax as part of thoracic endometriosis along with catamenial pneumothorax, catamenial hemoptysis, and lung nodules of endometriosis. Catamenial hemothorax represents 14% of cases of thoracic endometriosis syndrome while catamenial pneumothorax is seen in 73%, catamenial hemoptysis in 7%, and pulmonary nodules in 6%.

== Mechanism ==
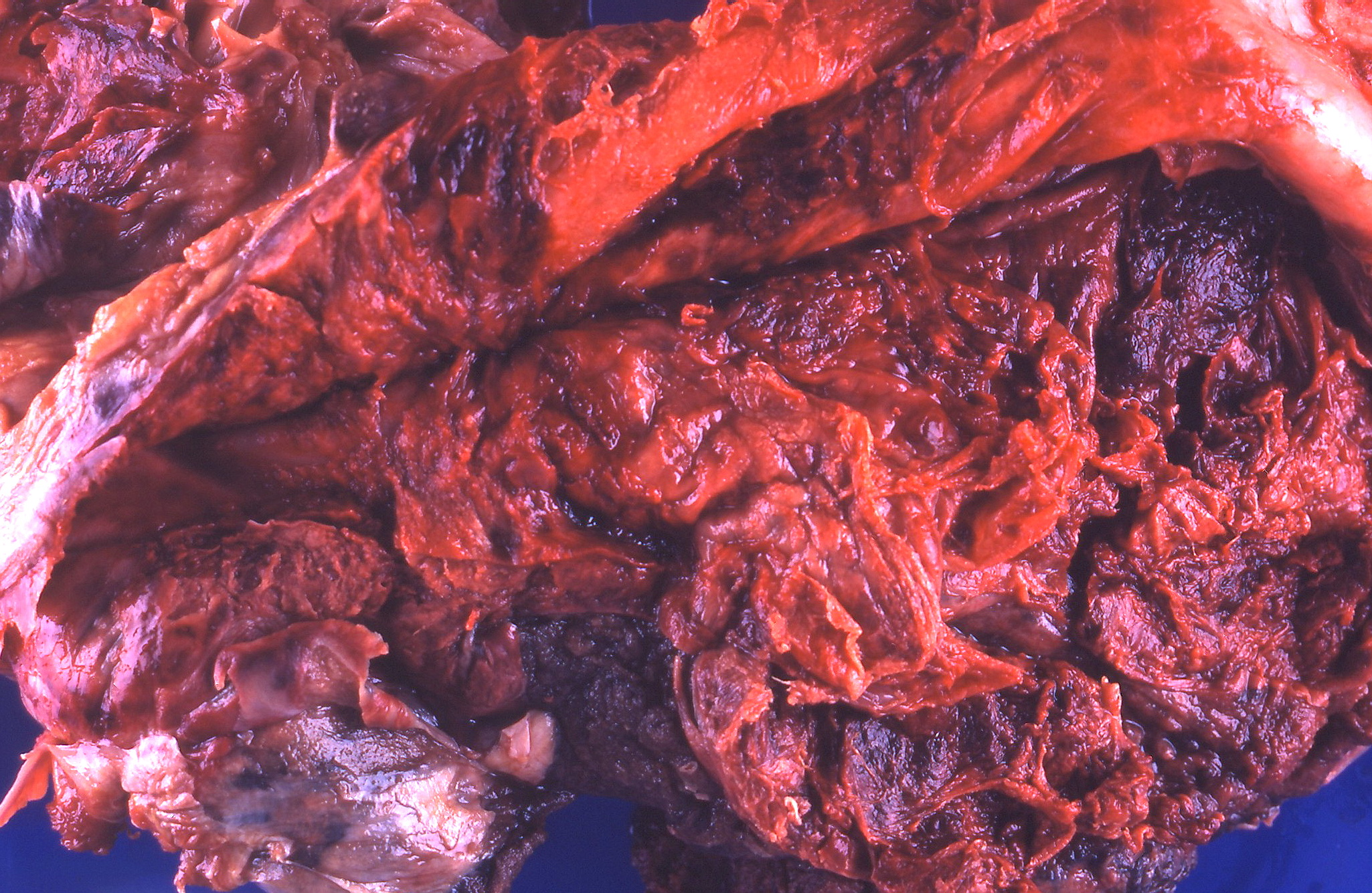
Autopsy specimen showing large clotted hemothorax filling the entire pleural cavity

When a hemothorax occurs, blood enters the pleural cavity. The blood loss from the circulation has several effects. Firstly, as blood builds up within the pleural cavity, it begins to interfere with the normal movement of the lungs, preventing one or both lungs from fully expanding and thereby interfering with the normal transfer of oxygen and carbon dioxide to and from the blood. Secondly, blood that has been lost into the pleural cavity can no longer be circulated. Hemothoraces can lead to significant blood loss – each half of the thorax can hold more than 1500 milliliters of blood, representing more than 25% of an average adult's total blood volume. The body may struggle to cope with this blood loss, and tries to compensate by maintaining blood pressure by forcing the heart to pump harder and faster, and by squeezing or constricting small blood vessels in the arms and legs. These compensatory mechanisms can be recognised by a rapid resting heart rate and cool fingers and toes.

If the blood within the pleural cavity is not removed, it will eventually clot. This clot tends to stick the parietal and visceral pleura together and has the potential to lead to scarring within the pleura, which if extensive leads to the condition known as a fibrothorax. Following the initial loss of blood, a small hemothorax may irritate the pleura, causing additional fluid to seep out, leading to a bloodstained pleural effusion. Furthermore, as enzymes in the pleural fluid begin to break down the clot, the protein concentration of the pleural fluid increases. As a result, the osmotic pressure of the pleural cavity increases, causing fluid to leak into the pleural cavity from the surrounding tissues.

== Diagnosis ==
Hemothoraces are most commonly detected using a chest X-ray, although ultrasound is sometimes used in an emergency setting. It can be suspected in any person with any form of chest trauma. However, plain X-rays may miss smaller hemothoraces while other imaging modalities such as computed tomography (CT), or magnetic resonance imaging may be more sensitive. In cases where the nature of an effusion is in doubt, a sample of fluid can be aspirated and analysed in a procedure called thoracentesis. Physical examination is used initially. Auscultation has been reported to have an accuracy of nearly 100% in diagnosing hemopneumothorax.

=== Chest X-ray ===
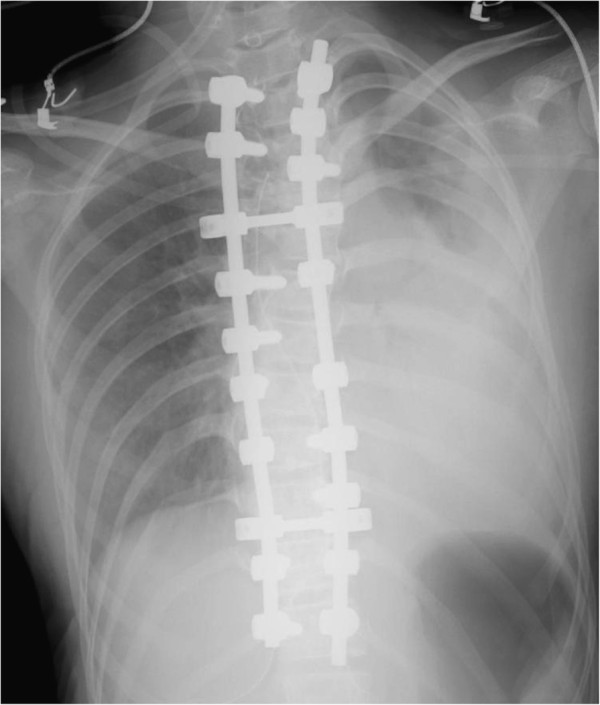
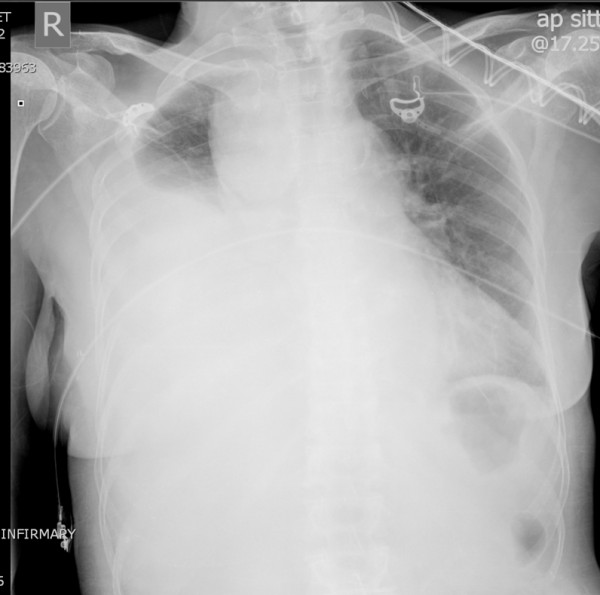
Two chest X-rays: left showing a massive left-sided hemothorax; right showing a massive right hemothorax

A chest X-ray is the most common technique used to diagnosis a hemothorax. X-rays should ideally be taken in an upright position (an erect chest X-ray), but may be performed with the person lying on their back (supine) if an erect chest X-ray is not feasible. On an erect chest X-ray, a hemothorax is suggested by blunting of the costophrenic angle or partial or complete opacification of the affected half of the thorax. On a supine film the blood tends to layer in the pleural space, but can be appreciated as a haziness of one half of the thorax relative to the other. A small hemothorax may be missed on a chest X-ray as several hundred milliliters of blood can be hidden by the diaphragm and abdominal viscera on an erect film. Supine X-rays are even less sensitive and as much as one liter of blood can be missed on a supine film.

=== Other methods ===
Ultrasonography may be used to detect hemothorax and other pleural effusions. This technique is of particular use in the critical care and trauma settings as it provides rapid, reliable results at the bedside. Ultrasound is more sensitive than chest x-ray in detecting hemothorax. Ultrasound can cause issues in people who are morbidly obese or have subcutaneous emphysema. When CT is unavailable in the current setting or the person cannot be moved to the scan, ultrasound is used.

Computed tomography (CT or CAT) scans may be useful for diagnosing retained hemothorax as this form of imaging can detect much smaller amounts of fluid than a plain chest X-ray. However, CT is less used as a primary means of diagnosis within the trauma setting, as these scans require a critically ill person to be transported to a scanner, are slower, and require the subject to remain supine.

Magnetic resonance imaging (MRI) can be used to differentiate between a hemothorax and other forms of pleural effusion, and can suggest how long the hemothorax has been present for. Fresh blood can be seen as a fluid with low T1 but high T2 signals, while blood that has been present for more than a few hours displays both low T1 and T2 signals. MRI is used infrequently in the trauma setting due to the prolonged time required to perform an MRI, and the deterioration in image quality that occurs with motion.

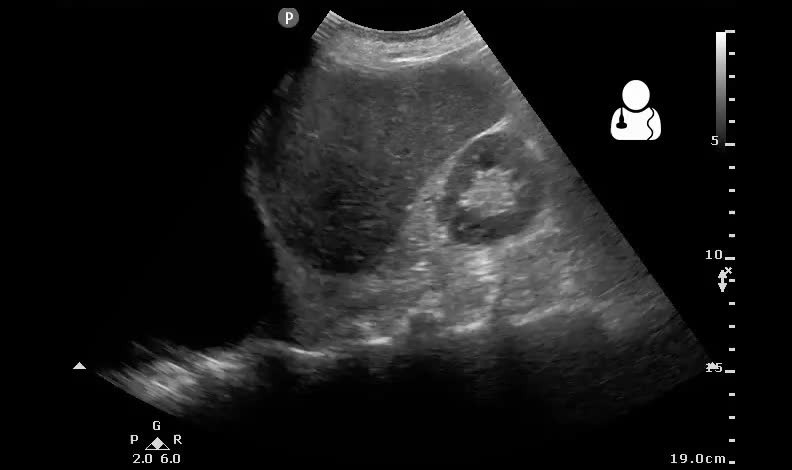
Ultrasound scan of the chest showing a left-sided hemothorax

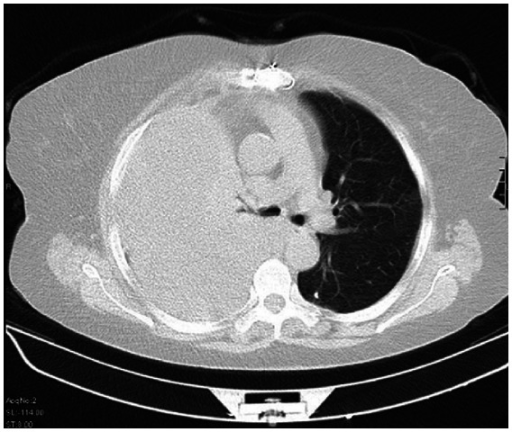
CT scan of the chest showing a hemothorax caused by warfarin use

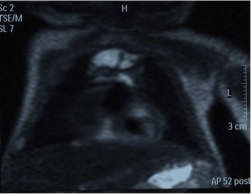
Chest MRI showing a hemothorax in a 16-day-old infant

=== Thoracentesis ===
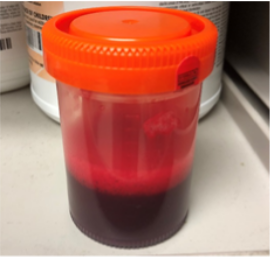
Pleural fluid sample from a hemothorax taken by thoracentesis

Although imaging techniques can demonstrate that fluid is present within the pleural space, it may be unclear what this fluid represents. To establish the nature of the fluid, a sample can be removed by inserting a needle into the pleural cavity in a procedure known as a thoracentesis or pleural tap. In this context, the most important assessment of the pleural fluid is the percentage by volume that is taken up by red blood cells (the hematocrit) A hemothorax is defined as having a hematocrit of at least 50% of that found in the affected person's blood, although the hematocrit of a chronic hemothorax may be 25–50% if additional fluid has been secreted by the pleura. Pleural fluid can dilute hemothoraces in as low as 3–4 days. The red blood cells in the effusion spontaneously break down. Distinguishing the pleural fluid from blood by colour is impossible when the hematocrit value is over 5%. For these reasons, even if there is a hematocrit value under 50%, further investigations can be done in order to figure out if there is a source of bleeding. Hematocrit can be roughly calculated by dividing the red blood cell count of the pleural fluid by 100,000. Thoracentesis is the test most commonly used to diagnose a hemothorax in animals. Hemothorax can itself be a rare complication of thoracentesis if the intercostal artery is punctured.

== Treatment ==
The treatment of a hemothorax depends largely on the extent of bleeding. While small hemothoraces may require little in the way of treatment, larger hemothoraces may require fluid resuscitation to replace the blood that has been lost, drainage of the blood within the pleural space using a procedure known as a tube thoracostomy, and potentially surgery in the form of a thoracotomy or video-assisted thoracoscopic surgery (VATS) to prevent further bleeding. Occasionally, transcatheter arterial embolization may be used to stop ongoing arterial bleeding. Additional treatment options include antibiotics to reduce the risk of infection and fibrinolytic therapy to break down clotted blood within the pleural space.

=== Thoracostomy ===
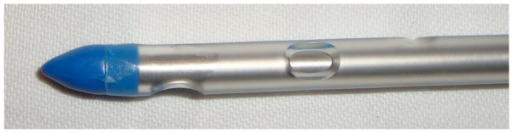
A tube thoracostomy unit

Blood in the cavity can be removed by inserting a drain (chest tube) in a procedure called a tube thoracostomy. This procedure is indicated for most causes of hemothorax, but should be avoided in aortic rupture which should be managed with immediate surgery. The thoracostomy tube is usually placed between the ribs in the sixth or seventh intercostal space at the mid-axillary line. It is important to avoid a chest tube becoming obstructed by clotted blood as obstruction prevents adequate drainage of the pleural space. Clotting occurs as the clotting cascade is activated when the blood leaves the blood vessels and comes into contact with the pleural surface, injured lung or chest wall, or the thoracostomy tube. Inadequate drainage may lead to a retained hemothorax, increasing the risk of infection within the pleural space (empyema) or the formation of scar tissue (fibrothorax). Thoracostomy tubes with a diameter of 24–36 F (large-bore tubes) should be used, as these reduce the risk of blood clots obstructing the tube. Manual manipulation of chest tubes (referred to as milking, stripping, or tapping) is commonly performed to maintain an open tube, but no conclusive evidence has demonstrated that this improves drainage. If a chest tube does become obstructed, the tube can be cleared using open or closed techniques. Tubes should be removed as soon as drainage has stopped, as prolonged tube placement increases the risk of empyema.

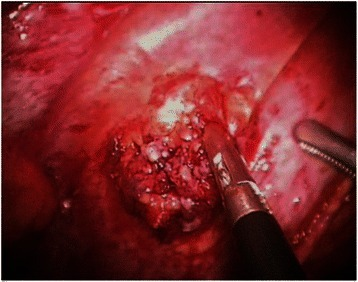
Hemothorax mid-VATS showing diaphragmatic injury caused by a costal exostosis

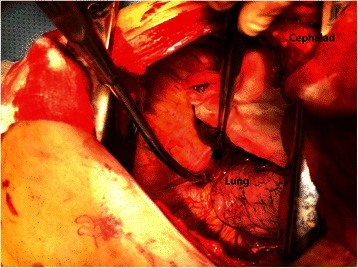
Hemothorax mid-thoracotomy showing bleeding from tears in the pulmonary ligament and no other obvious injuries

=== Surgery ===
About 10–20% of traumatic hemothoraces require surgical management. Larger hemothoraces, or those that continue to bleed following drainage, may require surgery. This surgery may take the form of a traditional open-chest procedure (a thoracotomy), but may be performed using video-associated thoracoscopic surgery (VATS). While there is no universally accepted cutoff for the volume of blood loss required before surgery is indicated, generally accepted indications include more than 1500 mL of blood drained from a thoracostomy, bleeding rate of over 500mL/hr in the first hour followed by over 200 mL, hemodynamic instability, or the need for repeat blood transfusions. VATS is less invasive and cheaper than an open thoracotomy, and can reduce the length of hospital stay, but a thoracotomy may be preferred when hypovolemic shock is present, in order to watch bleeding. The procedure should ideally be performed within 72 hours of the injury as delay may increase the risk of complications. In clotted hemothorax, VATS is the generally preferred procedure to remove the clot, and is indicated if the hemothorax fills 1/3 or more of a hemithorax. The ideal time to remove a clot using VATS is at 48–96 hours, but can be attempted up to nine days after the injury.

=== Other ===
Thoracentesis is no longer used in the treatment of hemothorax, although it may still be used to treat small hemothoraces. In catamenial hemothorax, the bleeding is typically self-limiting and mild. Most people with the condition are stable and can be treated with hormonal therapies. They are only partially effective. Surgical removal of the endometrial tissue may be necessary in recurrent cases. However, the disease frequently recurs. Resuscitation with intravenous fluids or with blood products may be required. In fulminant cases, transfusions may be administered before admission to the hospital. Clotting abnormalities, such as those caused by anticoagulant medications, should be reversed. Prophylactic antibiotics are given for 24 hours in the case of trauma. Blood clots may be retained within the pleural cavity despite chest tube drainage. They are a risk factor for complications like fibrothorax and empyema. Such retained clots should be removed, preferably with video-assisted thoracoscopic surgery (VATS). If VATS is unavailable, an alternative is fibrinolytic therapy such as streptokinase or urokinase given directly into the pleural space seven to ten days after the injury. The issues with fibrinolytic therapy include having a high cost and lengthened hospital stay. Residual clot that does not dissipate in response to fibrinolytics may require surgical removal in the form of decortication.

== Prognosis ==
The prognosis following a hemothorax depends on its size, the treatment given, and the underlying cause. While small hemothoraces may cause few problems, in severe cases an untreated hemothorax may be rapidly fatal due to uncontrolled blood loss. If left untreated, the accumulation of blood may put pressure on the mediastinum and the trachea, limiting the heart's ability to fill. However, if treated, the prognosis following a traumatic hemothorax is usually favourable and dependent on other non-thoracic injuries that have been sustained at the same time, the age of the person, and the need for mechanical ventilation. Hemothoraces caused by benign conditions such as endometriosis have a good prognosis, while those caused by neurofibromatosis type 1 has a 36% rate of death, and those caused by aortic rupture are often fatal. Penetrating trauma is significantly less common, and has a much higher death rate, with up to 90% dying before arriving at the hospital. Gunshot wounds are associated with a higher death rates compared to stab wounds. In cases of penetrating trauma involving the heart, less than 1% survive.

=== Complications ===
Complications can occur following a hemothorax, and are more likely to occur if the blood has not been adequately drained from the pleural cavity. Blood that remains within the pleural space can become infected, and is known as an empyema. It occurs in 3–4% of traumatic cases, and 27-33% of retained hemothoraces. It is more likely in people who develop shock, had a contaminated pleural space during the injury, persistent bronchopleural fistulae, and lung contusions. The likelihood of it can be reduced by keeping thoracostomy tubes sterile and by keeping the pleural surfaces close together to prevent fluid or blood from accumulating between the surfaces. The retained blood can irritate the pleura, causing scar tissue (adhesions) to form. If extensive, this scar tissue can encase the lung, restricting movement of the chest wall, and is then referred to as a fibrothorax. Less than 1 percent of cases go on to develop a fibrothorax. Cases with hemopneumothorax or infection more often develop fibrothorax. After the chest tube is removed, over 10% of cases develop pleural effusions that are mostly self-limited and leave no lasting complications. In such cases, thoracentesis is performed to eliminate the possibility of an infection being present. Other potential complications include atelectasis, lung infection, pneumothorax, sepsis, respiratory distress, hypotension, tachycardia, pneumonia, adhesions, and impaired lung function.

== Epidemiology ==
Trauma to the thorax results in approximately 16,000 to 30,000 deaths every year. There are about 300,000 cases of hemothorax in the U.S every year. Polytrauma (injury to multiple body systems) involves chest injuries in 60% of cases and commonly leads to hemothorax. In a case study, 37% of people hospitalized for blunt chest trauma had traumatic hemothorax. Hemothorax commonly occurs with a displaced rib fracture.

== Other animals ==
=== Horses ===
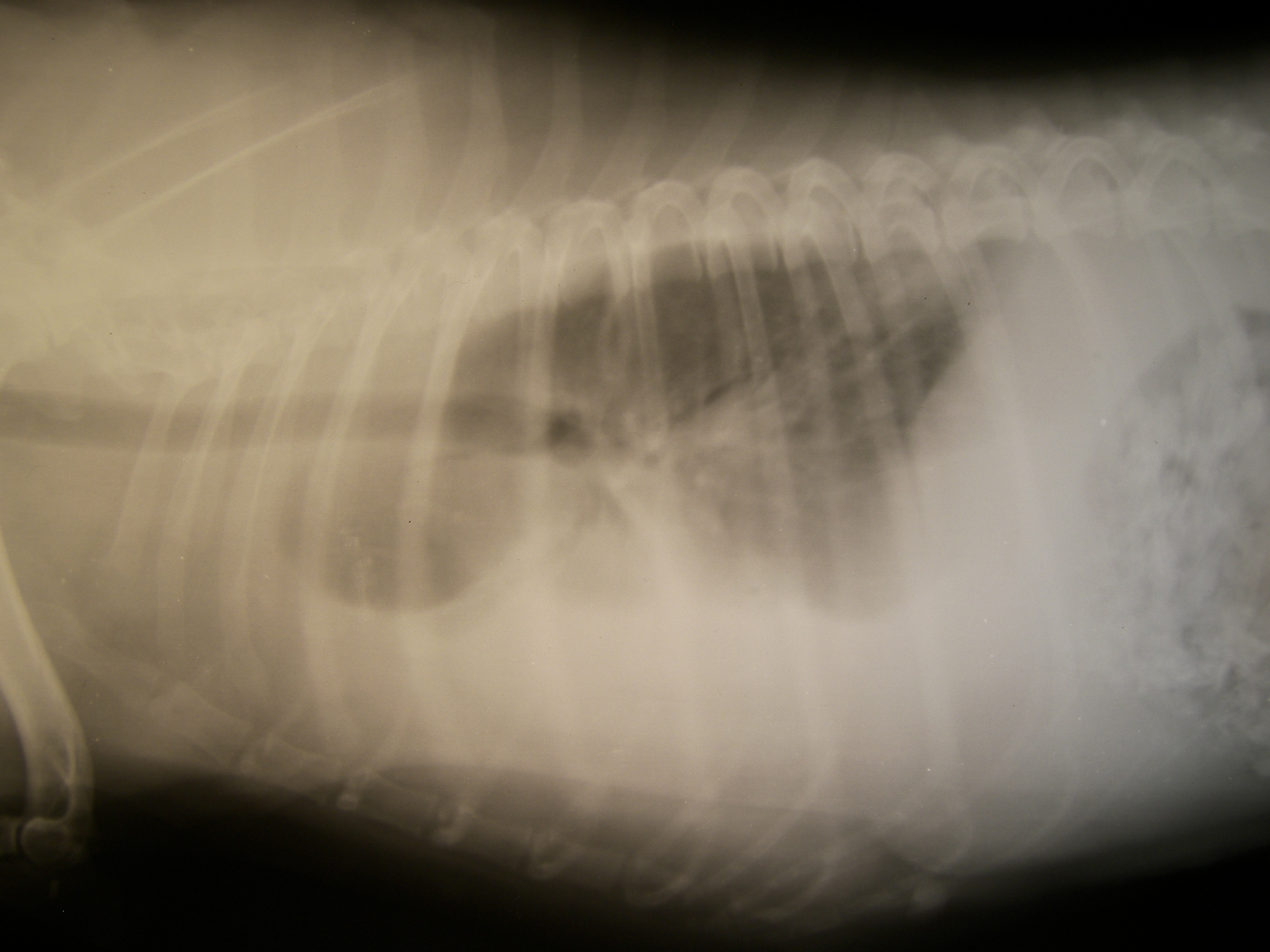
Hemothorax in an animal caused by anti-coagulant poisoning

In horses, hemothorax is uncommon and usually traumatic. It may occur along with pneumothorax. It is mainly diagnosed by ultrasound. Treatment involves supportive care, correction of the underlying cause, and occasionally drainage. The prognosis is variable.

Hemothorax is usually caused by trauma to the thorax. It can result from any injury that involves the pleural, intercostal, intervertebral, cardiac, or thoracic wall muscle. It can rarely be caused by diaphragmatic rupture that results in abdominal herniation. Hemothorax can be caused by cancers involving the thoracic, pulmonary, and mediastinal wall. The most common cancer resulting in hemothorax is a hemangiosarcoma.

Clinical signs and symptoms may be variable and cause-dependant. They may include rapid breathing, pain, and shallow breathing in cases with a rib fracture. In the case of extensive bleeding, signs of hypovolemia may occur, and rapid death may result within hours. In less acute cases with slower bleeding, anemia and hypoproteinemia may gradually develop.

Ultrasound can detect blood in the pleural cavity. Blood in the thorax is shown by a uniform area without flocculation. Pleural effusions without blood are usually hypoechoic. Echogenicity is indicated by cellular debris and/or fibrin. Bloody pleural effusions are shows by a swirling, hyperechoic pattern. When a stethoscope is used (auscultation), the heartbeat sounds are faint. When percussion is performed, it produces a dull area. However, especially in traumatic cases, percussion may be painful. Although nonspecific, physical examinations may show reduced lung sounds and muffled, widespread heart sounds. Similar signs and symptoms may occur when other fluids are in the pleural cavity.

Treatment includes correction of the underlying cause. Drainage is not always required, but can be performed in case of infection or fluid levels resulting in respiratory compromise. However, drainage in contraindicated in cases caused by clotting disorders. Additionally, broad spectrum antibiotics can be given in the case of open trauma or pulmonary rupture. Supportive care may be required. It may include intranasal oxygen, painkillers, blood transfusions, and fluids. In order to avoid fluid overload, fluids are given slowly.

The prognosis significantly depends on the underlying cause of the hemothorax. In cases caused by uncomplicated thoracic trauma, the prognosis may be good, but the prognosis is worse in cases that are complicated by pleuritis. Cases caused by cancer or clotting disorders have a poor prognosis, as do cases with massive bleeding due to injury to the heart or very large blood vessels.
