= Fibrothorax =

Medical condition involving fibrosis of the pleural space

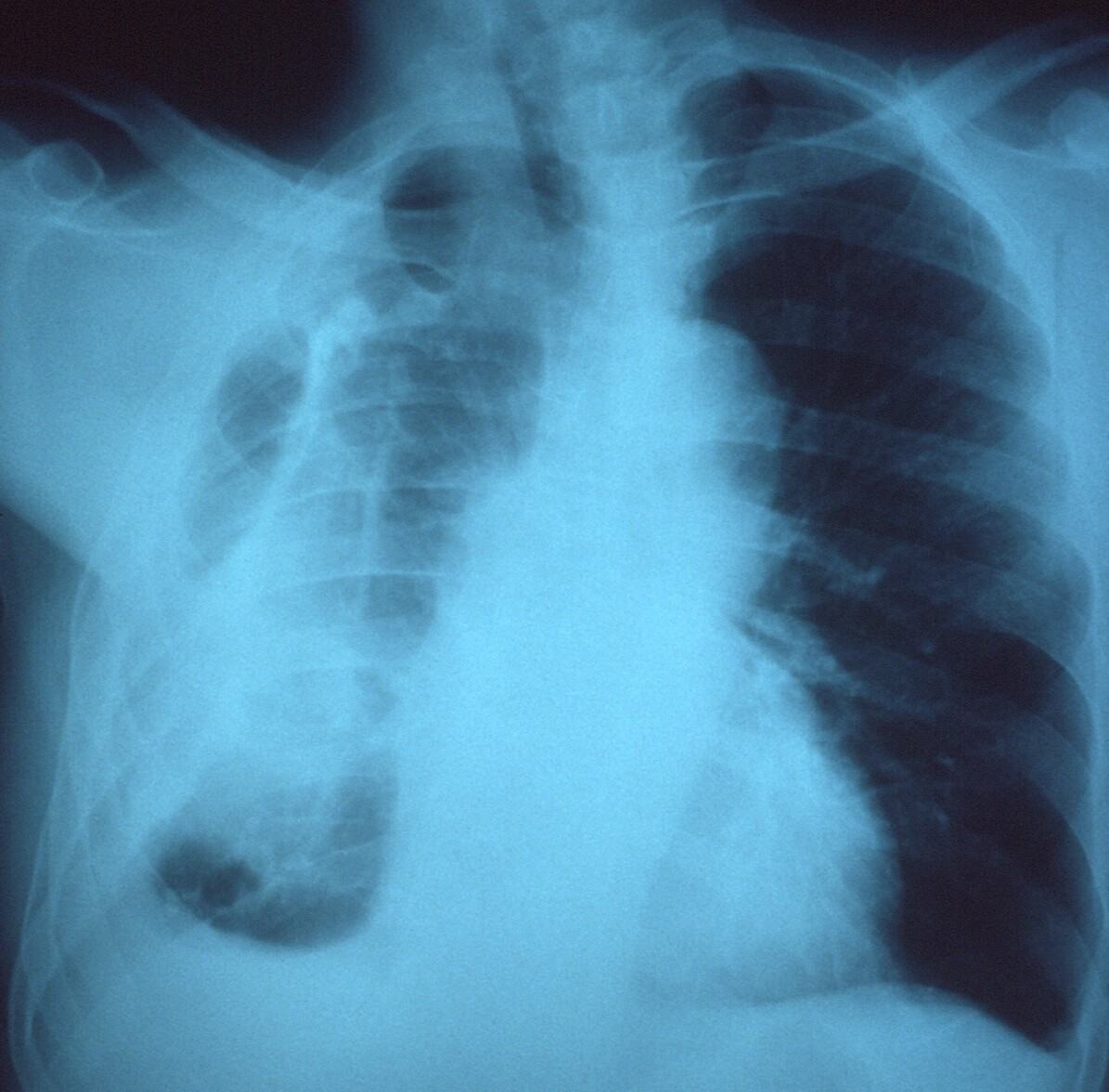
- Fibrothorax on chest x-ray
- Specialty: Respiratory medicine
- Symptoms: Breathlessness
- Usual onset: Adulthood
- Duration: Long-term
- Causes: Haemothorax, empyema, tuberculosis, collagen vascular diseases, uraemia, rheumatoid arthritis, pleurodesis, pleural effusion, certain medications
- Risk factors: Asbestos exposure, certain drugs
- Diagnostic method: Chest X-ray, CT scan
- Treatment: Watchful waiting, decortication
- Prognosis: Variable
- Frequency: Rare

Fibrothorax is a medical condition characterised by severe scarring (fibrosis) and fusion of the layers of the pleural space surrounding the lungs resulting in decreased movement of the lung and ribcage. The main symptom of fibrothorax is shortness of breath. There also may be recurrent fluid collections surrounding the lungs. Fibrothorax may occur as a complication of many diseases, including infection of the pleural space known as an empyema or bleeding into the pleural space known as a haemothorax.

Fibrosis in the pleura may be produced intentionally using a technique called pleurodesis to prevent recurrent punctured lung (pneumothorax), and the usually limited fibrosis that this produces can rarely be extensive enough to lead to fibrothorax. The condition is most often diagnosed using an X-ray or CT scan, the latter more readily detecting mild cases. Fibrothorax is often treated conservatively with watchful waiting but may require surgery. The outlook is usually good as long as there is no underlying pulmonary fibrosis or complications following surgery. The disease is highly uncommon.

== Signs and symptoms ==
=== Signs ===
Reduced movement of the ribcage during breathing, reduced breath sounds on the affected side(s), and a dull feeling when the chest is pressed are common signs observed during examination for fibrothorax. Sharp chest pain with deep breaths or coughing may be seen in some cases. Severe cases of fibrothorax can lead to respiratory failure due to inadequate ventilation and cause abnormally high levels of carbon dioxide in the bloodstream.

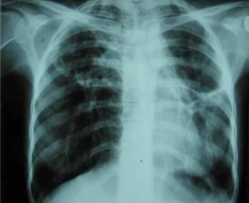
Chest X-ray showing bilateral fibrosis and pleural thickening in infection with non-tuberculosis mycobacteria.

=== Symptoms ===
The condition only causes symptoms if the visceral pleura is affected. Although fibrothorax may not cause any symptoms, people affected by the disorder may report shortness of breath. Persistent, recurrent pleural effusions are a possible symptom, caused by the persistent cavity formed by the hardening pleura around the original fluid collection. Shortness of breath tends to develop gradually and may worsen over time. Less commonly, fibrothorax may cause chest discomfort or a dry cough. Fibrothorax may occur as a complication of other diseases. Symptoms of the underlying problem are sometimes seen, for example, fever in cases of empyema.

== Causes ==
Fibrothorax is often a complication of other diseases that cause inflammation of the pleura. These include infections such as an empyema or tuberculosis, or bleeding within the pleural space known as a haemothorax. Exposure to certain substances, such as asbestos, can cause generalised fibrosis of the lungs, which may involve the pleura and lead to fibrothorax. Less common causes of fibrothorax include collagen vascular diseases such as systemic lupus erythematosus, sarcoidosis, and rheumatoid arthritis; kidney failure leading to uraemia; and side effects of certain medications. The medications most commonly associated with pleural fibrosis are the ergot alkaloids bromocriptine, pergolide, and methysergide. Fibrothorax may also occur without a clear underlying cause, in which case it is known as idiopathic fibrothorax.

A technique called pleurodesis can be used to intentionally create scar tissue within the pleural space, usually as a treatment for repeated episodes of a punctured lung, known as a pneumothorax, or for pleural effusions caused by cancer. While this procedure usually generates only limited scar tissue, in rare cases a fibrothorax can develop.

== Mechanism ==
Fibrosis can affect one or both of the two layers of tissue forming the pleura—the visceral pleura adjacent to the lung and the parietal pleura adjacent to the ribcage. The term fibrothorax implies severe fibrosis affecting both the visceral and the outer (parietal) pleura, fusing the lung to the chest wall. The condition starts as an undrained pleural effusion. Over time, the undrained pleural effusion causes sustained inflammation of the pleura, which can then lead to deposition of fibrin in the pleura and the development of a fibrotic scar. Eventually, a "peel" that is rich in collagen forms around the fluid collection. From this point, the illness can no longer be treated with thoracentesis, since the fluid will return to the cavity maintained by the peel.

Over time, generally over the years, the fibrotic scar tissue slowly tightens and thickens, contracting the contents of one or both halves of the chest and reducing the mobility of the ribs. The peel can become deeper than 2 cm. Within the chest, the lung is compressed and unable to expand (trapped lung), making it vulnerable to collapse and causing breathlessness. Restrictive lung disease from fibrothorax may occur when pleural fibrosis is so severe that it involves the diaphragm and ribcage and results primarily from decreased rib movement.

=== Microscopic ===
At the microscopic level, collagen fibres deposit in a basket weave pattern and form scar tissue. Usually, the underlying condition has to cause intense inflammation of the pleura, though it is unclear exactly how this results in fibrosis. The precise mechanisms producing the fibrosis are not entirely clear. However, research indicates a protein called Transforming Growth Factor beta (TGF-β) plays a central role in producing fibrothorax. Anti-TGF-β antibodies prevent fibrothorax in empyema in animal models.

== Diagnosis ==
A fibrothorax can typically be diagnosed by taking an appropriate medical history in combination with the use of appropriate imaging techniques such as a plain chest X-ray or CT scan. These imaging techniques can detect fibrothorax and pleural thickening that surround the lungs. The presence of a thickened peel with or without calcification are common features of fibrothorax when imaged. CT scans can more readily differentiate whether pleural thickening is due to extra fat deposition or true pleural thickening than X-rays.

If a fibrothorax is severe, the thickening may restrict the lung on the affected side causing a loss of lung volume. Additionally, the mediastinum may be physically shifted toward the affected side. A reduction in the size of one side of the chest (hemithorax) on an X-ray or CT scan of the chest suggests chronic scarring. Signs of the underlying disease causing the fibrothorax are also occasionally seen on the X-ray. A CT scan may show features similar to those seen on a plain X-ray. Lung function testing typically demonstrates findings consistent with restrictive lung disease.

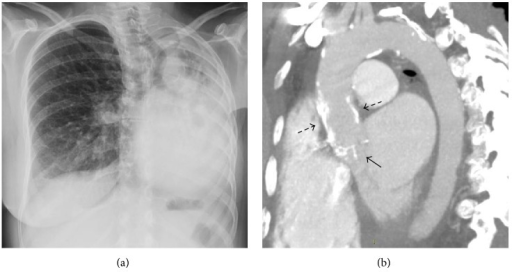
Extensive left-sided fibrothorax

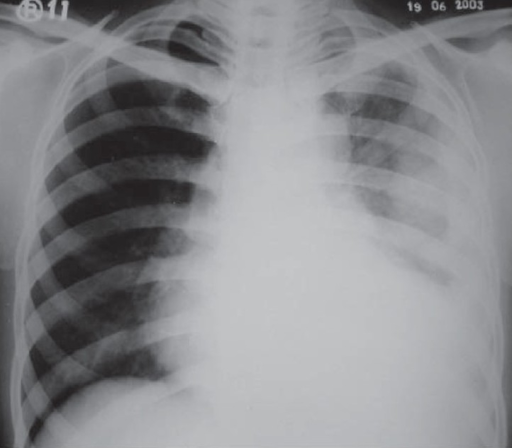
Chest radiograph displaying inhomogeneous opacification of the left half of the chest that is fibrothorax

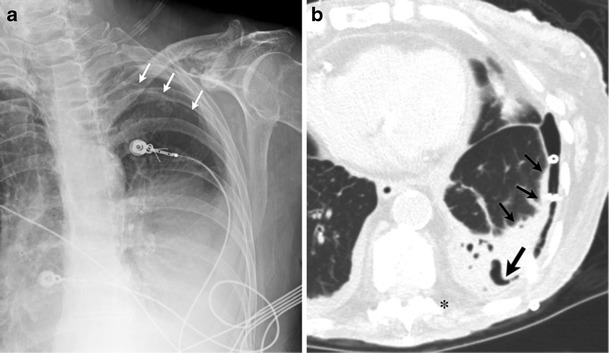
Chest X-ray (left) and CT scan (right) demonstrating fibrothorax

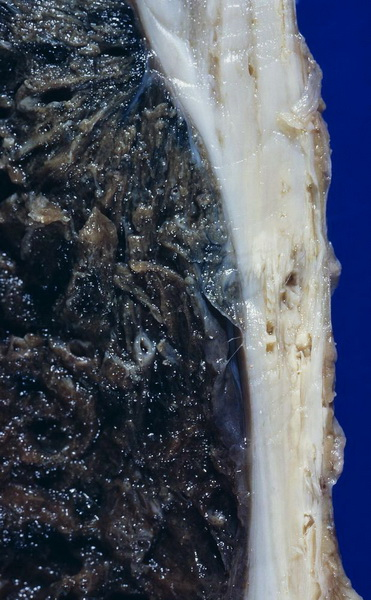
Autopsy specimen showing extensive pleural fibrosis

== Treatment ==
=== Non-surgical ===
Conservative non-surgical treatment of fibrothorax is generally done by treating its underlying cause and is reserved for milder cases. Tobacco smoking cessation is strongly recommended since tobacco smoke exposure can worsen fibrosis. Severe cases of fibrothorax may require supportive mechanical ventilation if the affected person is unable to breathe adequately on their own.

In cases of fibrothorax caused by medication, it is recommended that the offending medications be stopped. Ergot alkaloid medications, which can worsen pleural fibrosis, are typically avoided. Cases of fibrothorax attributable to medication typically stop worsening if the provoking medication is stopped. In some situations, medication-induced fibrothorax improves after stopping the causative medication but fibrothorax usually does not completely resolve.

Watchful waiting is appropriate for milder cases of fibrothorax in certain situations. Fibrothorax caused by tuberculosis, empyema, or haemothorax often improves spontaneously 3–6 months after the precipitating illness. Corticosteroids are commonly used to treat fibrothorax but are not well-supported by available evidence.

=== Surgical ===
In severe cases of fibrothorax that are compromising a person's ability to breathe, the scar tissue (fibrous peel) causing fibrothorax can be surgically removed using a technique called decortication. However, surgical decortication is an invasive procedure which carries the risk of complications including a small risk of death, and is therefore generally only considered if severe symptoms are present and have been for many months. Surgical decortication is generally considered for people with fibrothoraces that are severe, causing significant shortness of breath, and have otherwise relatively healthy lungs since this enhances the likelihood of a better outcome. Surgical removal of the pleura (pleurectomy) may be performed in refractory cases, as often happens when asbestosis is the cause.

== Prognosis ==
Fibrothorax complicating another condition, such as tuberculous pleuritis, empyema, or acute haemothorax often spontaneously resolves in 3-6 months.

The prognosis after surgical decortication is variable and depends on the health of the underlying lung before the procedure takes place. If the lung was otherwise healthy, then certain aspects of lung function, such as vital capacity, may improve after decortication. If, however, the lung had significant disease, then lung function often does not improve and may even deteriorate after such intervention. The duration of fibrothorax does not affect prognosis.

The mortality of surgery is less than 1% overall, but rises to 4-6% in the elderly. Other factors predicting poorer surgical outcomes include intraoperative complications, incomplete surgery, lung disease beyond the fibrothorax being treated, and specific causes of fibrothorax such as asbestosis.

== Epidemiology ==
Sporadic cases are rarely reported in the medical literature, for example, due to iatrogenic or postoperative complications. Fibrothorax is rare in developed countries, mainly due to a lower incidence of tuberculosis. The condition is far more common in workers exposed to asbestos, with 5–13.5% of those exposed subsequently developing some degree of pleural fibrosis, sometimes not diagnosed until decades after the initial exposure.
