= Breast biopsy =

Surgical diagnostic procedure for breast tumours

Surgical Breast Biopsy
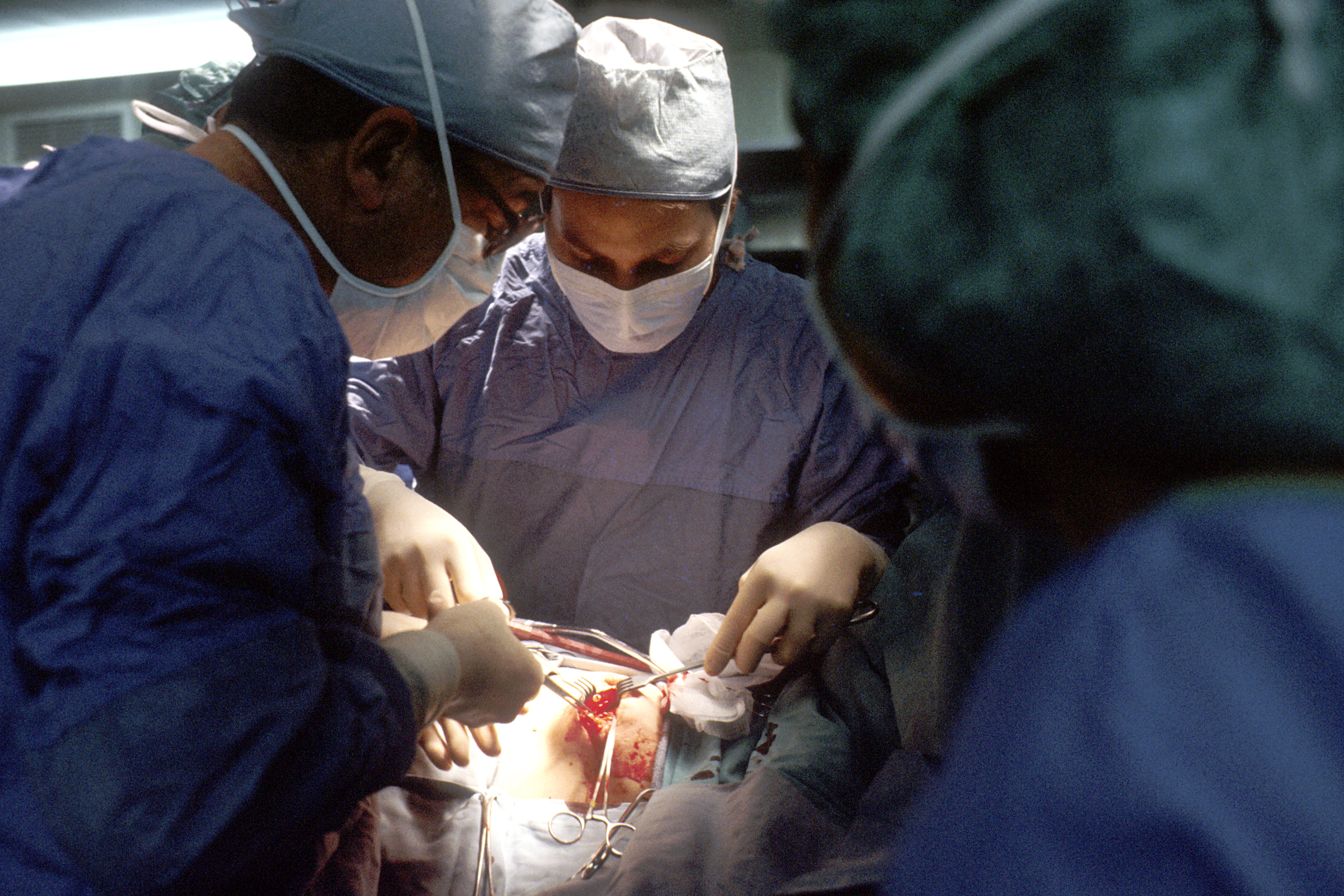
- Surgeon doing a surgical breast biopsy
- ICD-9-CM: 85.11-85.12

A breast biopsy is a medical procedure used to remove a small sample of breast tissue to examine it more closely under a microscope. It is usually done after a suspicious lesion is discovered on either mammography or ultrasound to get tissue for pathological diagnosis. Several methods for a breast biopsy now exist. The most appropriate method of biopsy for a patient depends upon a variety of factors, including the size, location, appearance and characteristics of the abnormality. The different types of breast biopsies include fine-needle aspiration (FNA), vacuum-assisted biopsy, core needle biopsy, and surgical excision biopsy. Breast biopsies can be done utilizing ultrasound, MRI or a stereotactic biopsy imaging guidance. Vacuum assisted biopsies are typically done using stereotactic techniques when the suspicious lesion can only be seen on mammography. On average, 5–10 biopsies of a suspicious breast lesion will lead to the diagnosis of one case of breast cancer. Needle biopsies have largely replaced open surgical biopsies in the initial assessment of imaging as well as palpable abnormalities in the breast.

== Indications ==
There are many reasons why a doctor may order a breast biopsy. Typical indications include:

- A suspicious area on mammography or ultrasound. This may include:
  - Microcalcifications on MRI.
  - BI-RADS score of 4 or 5 on mammography, ultrasound, or MRI.
- A suspicious hard palpable lump
- Skin changes like crusting, scaling, or dimpling of the breast, which may signal an underlying breast cancer
- Abnormal nipple discharge

== Fine-needle aspiration ==
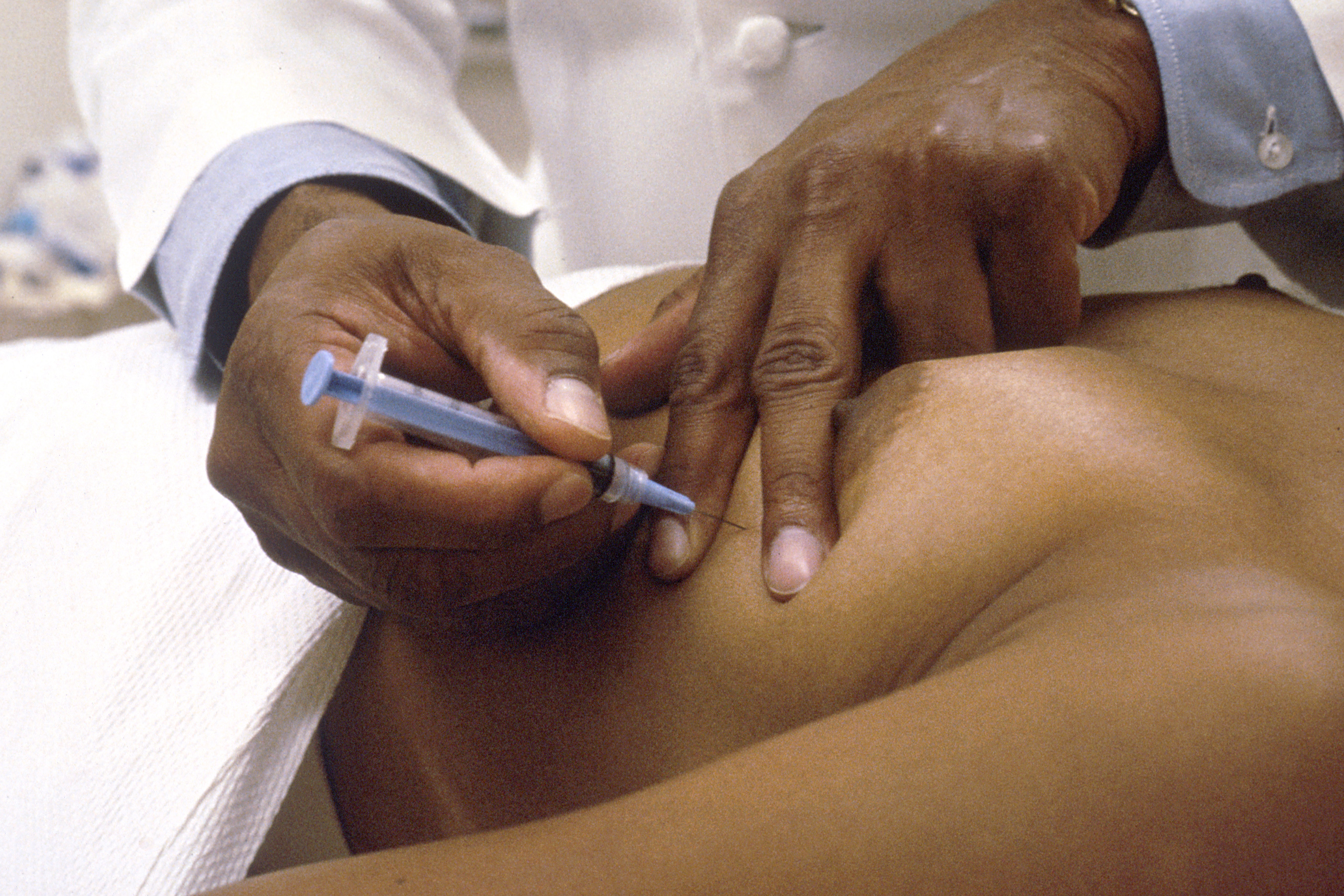
Fine-needle aspiration

Fine-needle aspiration (FNA) is a percutaneous ("through the skin") procedure that uses a fine needle and a syringe to sample fluid from a breast cyst or remove clusters of cells from a solid mass. It is mainly used to differentiate between a cyst and a mass. If the aspirated contents are not cyst-like, then a tissue sample must be taken to better evaluate the mass. Fine-needle aspiration is one of the most commonly used initial diagnostic tools for suspicious lesions. The doctor will typically use a 22 or 27 gauge needle to aspirate out free fluid and cells. It can be done in an outpatient setting and is associated with minimal pain. However, in up to 30% of cases, pathological slides from fine-needle aspiration of breast lesions may be inconclusive, necessitating the need for further testing. FNA can be done to aspirate the contents of a cyst, which may relieve any pain that the cyst caused, or can be used to aspirate a suspicious lesion in conjunction with cytology (cellular analysis). If aspirating the contents of a cyst, the aspirate is usually not sent for cytology unless it is bloody. If the cyst is not detectable by touch, it may be located using ultrasound, MRI, or stereotactic mammography. Recovery time from an outpatient FNA is minimal.

== Core needle biopsy ==
Core needle biopsy (CNB) is another percutaneous ("through the skin") method of breast biopsy that became more popular than FNA in the 1990s due to the larger sample of tissue CNB provides. This method is usually done under ultrasound guidance and involves using two needles, one inner "puncture" needle that is inserted into the mass, and a wider gauge needle with an open "gap" or "trough" on one side that allows for tissue to enter. A spring-loaded sheath is then triggered by the technician that covers the trough in the needle to allow sample tissue to be separated and removed for analysis. Typically, four tissue samples are removed to minimize sample error. To prevent the need to pierce the breast repeatedly, a coaxial needle is left in place on top of the mass as a guide. CNB has a higher sensitivity for cancer than FNA, has lower false negatives, and has proven more successful in finding rare breast diseases like lobular carcinoma. However, this method still has relatively high rates of false negatives compared to surgical or vacuum-assisted methods due to the overall low volume of tissue removed. Also, because breast tissue can be difficult to target on ultrasound, as many as 5–10% of suspicious lesions are missed by the needle and may result in a high rate of false negatives, or the need for additional biopsies.

== Stereotactic biopsy ==
Stereotactic biopsy is done with the help of a specialized device, which provides mammographic guidance. For a stereotactic biopsy, morbid obesity is a relative contraindication due to the weight limitations of the devices. Pregnancy and breast compression size may also be contraindications, depending on the modality being used.

== Vacuum-assisted breast biopsy ==
Vacuum-assisted breast biopsy (VABB) is a more recent version of core needle biopsy using a vacuum technique to assist the collection of the tissue sample. Similarly to core needle biopsy, the needle has a lateral ("from the side") opening and can be rotated, allowing multiple samples to be collected through a single skin incision. This method has become more popular than FNA, CNB, and surgical biopsies due to the benefits of low invasiveness while still obtaining a larger tissue sample. Taking more tissue helps reduce sampling error since breast lesions are often heterogeneous (cancer cells are spread unevenly) and therefore cancer can be missed if not enough tissue is taken. VABB can be guided by stereotactic (most popular), ultrasound, and MRI, and can yield as much as 2g of tissue sample. The vacuum-assisted biopsy category also includes automated rotational core devices.

== Direct and frontal biopsy ==
The direct and frontal biopsy systems can even be considered relatively painless. The quality of the sample is sufficient for research on molecular biology.

== Excisional (surgical) biopsy ==
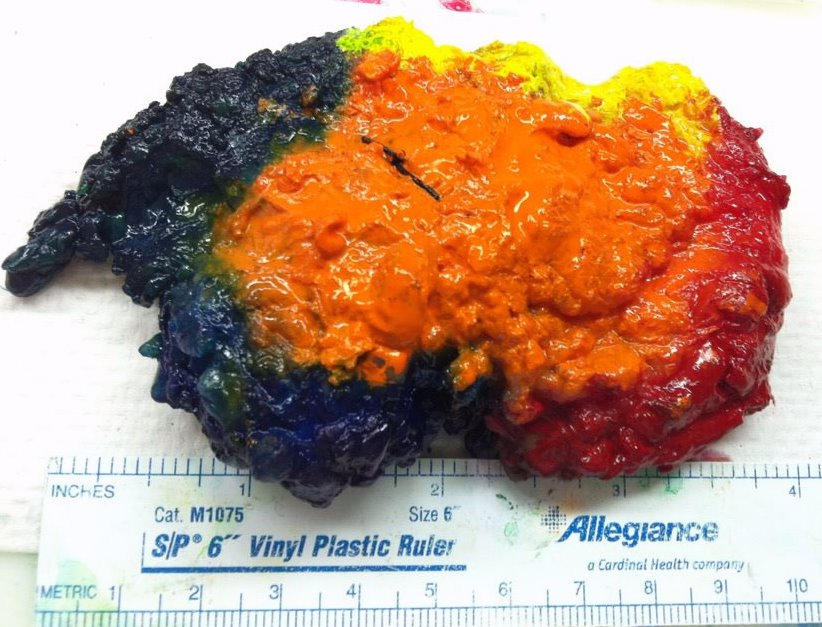
Surgical breast biopsy specimen that has been inked on all sides to aid a pathologist in evaluating tissue margins under the microscope.

Excisional biopsy involves surgically removing the suspicious area of the breast to examine it under the microscope for diagnosis. One method is wire-guided (or wire-localized) excisional biopsy, where a wire is inserted into the breast and repeatedly imaged using breast ultrasound or mammography until the technician sees that the tip is located in the suspicious area. The suspicious area is then removed entirely in one block by the surgeon with the help of the wire. When the tissue is removed, it is processed by a pathologist, who describes the tissue as it appears by eye and inks the sides to help orient the tissue under the microscope after it is sliced. Each color corresponds to a direction, such as superior, inferior, medial, lateral, anterior, and posterior (these correspond to top, bottom, outside, inside, front, and back). When the tissue is then looked at under the microscope, the margins can be evaluated to see if they are free of cancer cells, or if the surgeon needs to go back and remove more tissue from that area. Titanium surgical clips are often left behind by surgeons to help future physicians locate the site and monitor for future disease or target the area with radiation if needed. Percutaneous ("through the skin") biopsy methods have become more favored over surgical biopsies due to the high rate of benign findings (80%) and the reduction of adverse effects such as scarring.

== Adverse effects ==
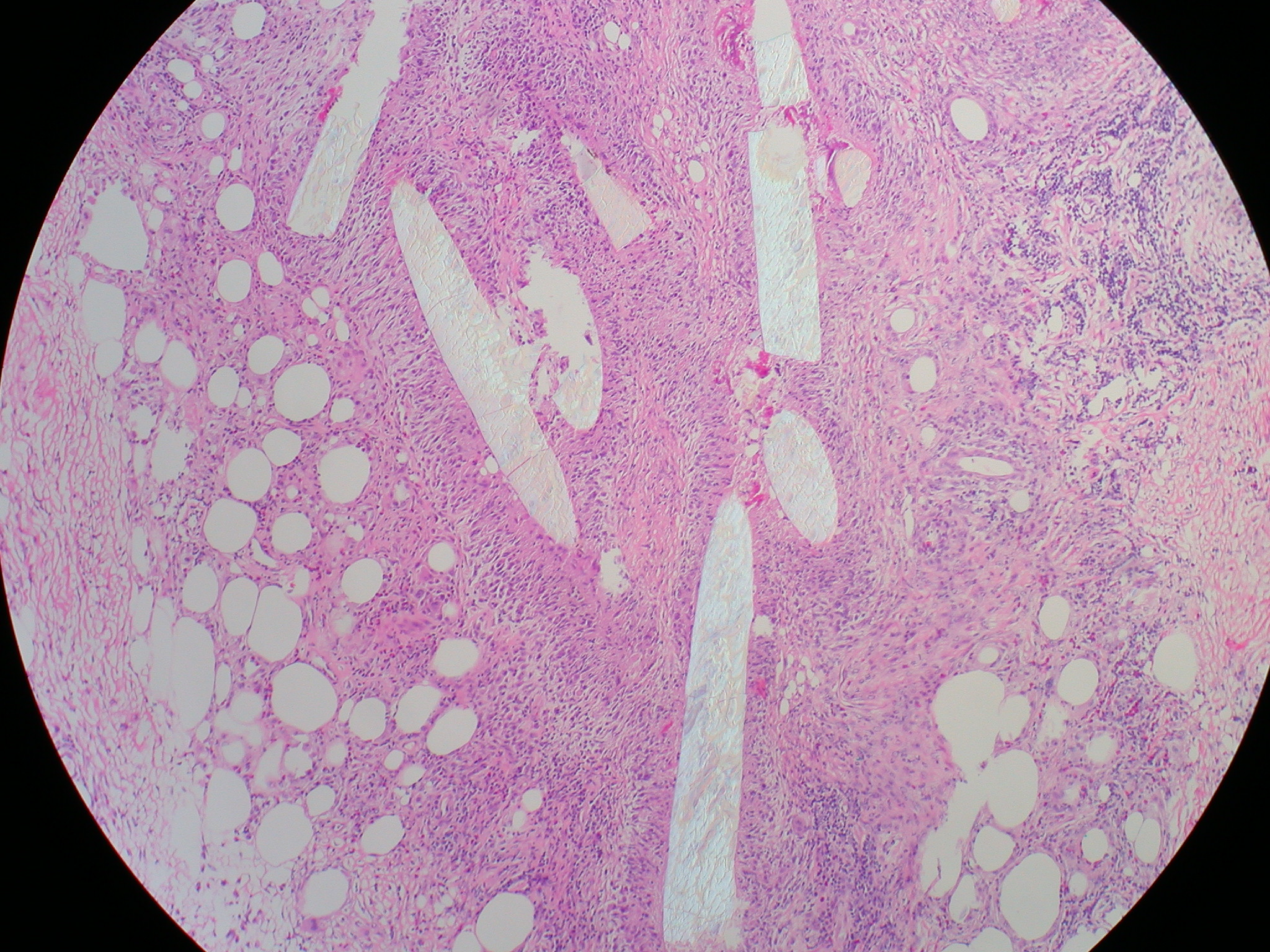
Radiographic marker in a lumpectomy specimen

Adverse effects of breast biopsies tend to vary depending on the type of biopsy performed. The more invasive, such as surgery, tend to have more severe types of adverse incidents, whereas less invasive techniques, such as FNA or CNB, tend to have less severe adverse incidents. For vacuum-assisted biopsies, some complications of the procedure can include bleeding, post-operative pain, and hematoma formation. However, most can be avoided with proper application of pressure and rest. Some examples of adverse effects of core needle biopsies can include rare biopsy risks like infection, abscess formation, fistula formation, migration of any markers placed in the breast, and potential seeding of the tumor (causing displacement of cancer cells due to the procedure that can start new tumors elsewhere). Another potential adverse effect occurs when taking a biopsy of an area of microcalcification. If the entire area of microcalcification is removed, it is then challenging to find the suspicious area in the future for treatment. A marker is placed in the suspicious area to help localize the proper area for possible removal at a later date; if this is removed during biopsy, it can be difficult to ensure that the correct area was excised in surgery. Bleeding into the site of the suspicious lesion caused by the biopsy procedure can appear to look like a complex cyst on ultrasound, which could lead to additional unnecessary management. The false negative rate of the results of a breast biopsy is approximately 1%.
