= Mammotome =

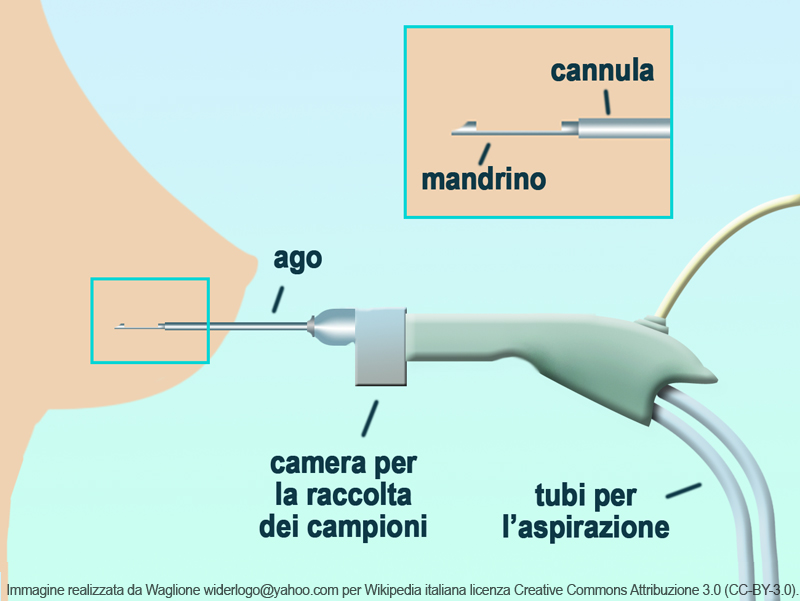
Schematic representation of a vacuum-assisted biopsy probe

Mammotome is a Cincinnati, Ohio–based company who pioneered a vacuum-assisted breast biopsy (VAC) device that uses image guidance such as x-ray, ultrasound and/or MRI to perform breast biopsies. A biopsy using a Mammotome® device can be done on an outpatient basis with a local anesthetic. The Mammotome brand is sold in over 45 countries.

== Indications ==
A stereotaxic macro-biopsy is often indicated after suspicious elements are seen on a mammography (mass, micro-calcifications or focal abnormal changes in the tissues). It is always used to analyse those elements but can sometimes also remove it completely. It is often used when:

- The mammography shows a suspicious solid mass.
- The mammography shows a suspicious "islet" of micro-calcifications.
- The breast tissue seems deformed.
- A new mass or micro-calcification islet is spotted in a zone previously targeted by surgery.

== Risks associated with the procedure ==
Side effects:

- Common: bruising, mild discomfort during the procedure, mild bleeding and tenderness at the biopsy site.
- Rare: significant bleeding or pain during biopsy, significant tenderness and bleeding at the biopsy site.

Complications:

- Rare: Post-biopsy breast infection. Allergic reaction to the local anaesthetic.

Complications from biopsies can delay subsequent breast surgery.

The procedure may, rarely, fail due to inaccurate sampling of the lesion; results may underestimate the severity of the lesion although these risks do not differ from other biopsy or surgical procedures. Occasionally, even after a successful biopsy, the diagnosis may remain uncertain and require a surgical biopsy, especially when atypical or precancerous cells are found on core biopsy.

== Limitations of the procedure ==
Lesions accompanied by diffuse calcium deposits scattered throughout the breast or located near the chest wall are difficult to target or evaluate by stereotactic biopsy. If the mammogram shows only a vague change in tissue density but no definite mass or nodule, the x-ray-guided method may not be successful.
