= Pleurisy =

Inflammation of the membranes lining the chest cavity (pleurae)

- Other names: Pleuritis, Pleurosis, pleuritic chest pain
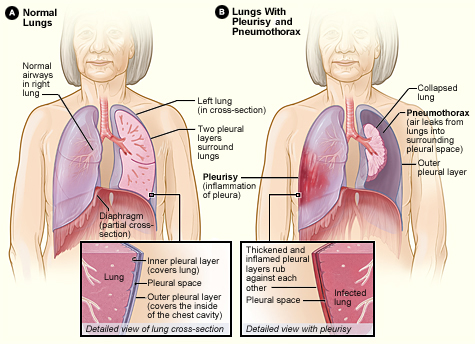
- Figure A shows normal anatomy. Figure B shows lungs with pleurisy in the right lung, and a pneumothorax of the left lung.
- Specialty: Pulmonology
- Symptoms: Sharp chest pain
- Causes: Viral infection, bacterial infection, pneumonia, pulmonary embolism
- Diagnostic method: Chest X-ray, electrocardiogram (ECG), blood tests
- Differential diagnosis: Pericarditis, heart attack, cholecystitis
- Treatment: Based on the underlying cause
- Medication: Paracetamol (acetaminophen), ibuprofen

Pleurisy, also known as pleuritis, is inflammation of the membranes that surround the lungs and line the chest cavity (pleurae). This can result in a sharp chest pain while breathing. Occasionally the pain may be a constant dull ache. Other symptoms may include shortness of breath, cough, fever, and weight loss, depending on the underlying cause.

Pleurisy can be caused by a variety of conditions, including viral or bacterial infections, autoimmune disorders, and pulmonary embolism. The most common cause is a viral infection. Other causes include bacterial infection, pneumonia, pulmonary embolism, autoimmune disorders, lung cancer, following heart surgery, pancreatitis and asbestosis. Occasionally the cause remains unknown. The underlying mechanism involves the rubbing together of the pleurae instead of smooth gliding. Other conditions that can produce similar symptoms include pericarditis, heart attack, cholecystitis, pulmonary embolism, and pneumothorax. Diagnostic testing may include a chest X-ray, electrocardiogram (ECG), and blood tests.

Treatment depends on the underlying cause. Paracetamol (acetaminophen) and ibuprofen may be used to decrease pain. Incentive spirometry may be recommended to encourage larger breaths. About one million people are affected in the United States each year. Descriptions of the condition date from at least as early as 400 BC by Hippocrates.

== Signs and symptoms ==
The defining symptom of pleurisy is a sudden sharp, stabbing, burning or dull pain in the right or left side of the chest during breathing, especially when one inhales and exhales. It feels worse with deep breathing, coughing, sneezing, or laughing. The pain may stay in one place, or it may spread to the shoulder or back. Sometimes, it becomes a constant, dull ache.

Depending on its cause, pleuritic chest pain may be accompanied by other symptoms:

- Dry cough
- Fever and chills
- Rapid, shallow breathing
- Shortness of breath
- Fast heart rate
- Sore throat followed by pain and swelling in the joints

=== Related problems ===
Pleurisy is often associated with complications that affect the pleural space.

==== Pleural effusion ====
In some cases of pleurisy, excess fluid builds up in the pleural space. This is called a pleural effusion. The buildup of excess fluid, will more often than not force the two layers of the pleura apart so they do not rub against each other when breathing. This can relieve the pain of pleurisy. A large amount of fluid can result in collapse of the lung. This can make it difficult to breathe.

In some cases of pleural effusion, the excess fluid becomes infected and turns into an abscess. This is called an empyema.

Pleural effusion involving fibrinous exudates in the fluid may be called fibrinous pleurisy, which sometimes occurs as a later stage of pleurisy.

A person can develop a pleural effusion in the absence of pleurisy. For example, pneumonia, heart failure, cancer, or a pulmonary embolism can lead to a pleural effusion.

==== Pneumothorax ====
Air or gas also can build up in the pleural space. This is called a pneumothorax. It can result from acute lung injury or a lung disease like emphysema. Lung procedures, like surgery, drainage of fluid with a needle, examination of the lung from the inside with a light and a camera, or mechanical ventilation, also can cause a pneumothorax.

The most common symptom is sudden pain in one side of the lung and shortness of breath. A pneumothorax also can put pressure on the lung and cause it to collapse.

If the pneumothorax is small, it may go away on its own. If large, a chest tube is placed through the skin and chest wall into the pleural space to remove the air.

==== Hemothorax ====
Blood can also collect in the pleural space. This is called hemothorax. The most common cause is injury to the chest from blunt force or surgery on the heart or chest. Hemothorax also can occur in people with lung or pleural cancer.

Hemothorax can put pressure on the lung and force it to collapse. It can also cause shock, a state of hypoperfusion in which an insufficient amount of blood is able to reach the organs.

== Causes ==
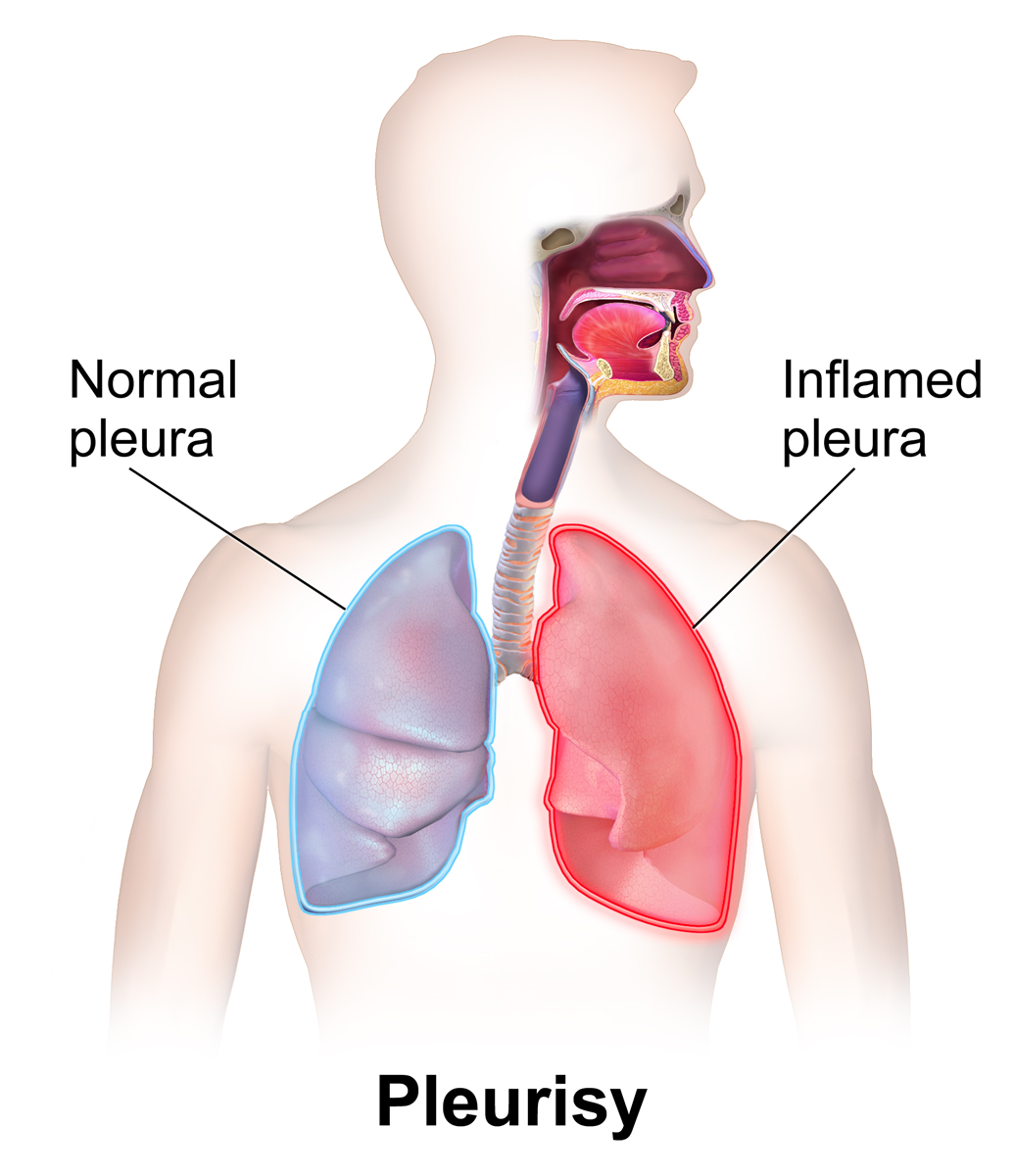
Pleurisy

Pleural linings and space (marked in blue)

The pleural space can be invaded by fluid, air, and particles from other parts of the body, which complicates the diagnosis. Viral infection (coxsackie B virus, HRSV, CMV, adenovirus, EBV, parainfluenza, influenza, COVID-19) is the most common cause of pleurisy. However, many other different conditions can cause pleuritic chest pain:

- Aortic dissections
- Autoimmune disorders such as systemic lupus erythematosus (or drug-induced lupus erythematosus), Autoimmune hepatitis (AIH), rheumatoid arthritis and Behçet's disease.
- Bacterial infections associated with pneumonia and tuberculosis
- Chest injuries (blunt or penetrating)
- Familial Mediterranean fever, an inherited condition that often causes fever and swelling in the abdomen or the lungs
- Fungal or parasitic infections
- Heart surgery, especially coronary-artery bypass grafting
- Cardiac problems (ischemia, pericarditis)
- Inflammatory bowel disease
- Lung cancer and lymphoma
- Other lung diseases like cystic fibrosis, sarcoidosis, asbestosis, lymphangioleiomyomatosis, and mesothelioma
- Pneumothorax
- Pulmonary embolisms, which are blood clots that enter the lungs

When the space between the pleurae starts to fill with fluid, as in pleural effusion, the chest pain can be eased but a shortness of breath can result, since the lungs need room to expand during breathing. Some cases of pleuritic chest pain are idiopathic, which means that the exact cause cannot be determined.

== Diagnosis ==
A diagnosis of pleurisy or another pleural condition is based on a medical history, physical examinations, and diagnostic tests. The goals are to rule out other sources of the symptoms and to find the cause of the pleurisy so that the underlying disorder can be treated.

=== Physical examination ===
A doctor uses a stethoscope to listen to the breathing. This method detects any unusual sounds in the lungs. A person with pleurisy may have inflamed layers of the pleurae that make a rough, scratchy sound as they rub against each other during breathing. This is called pleural friction rub.

=== Diagnostic tests ===
Depending on the results of the physical examination, diagnostic tests are sometimes performed.

==== Chest X-ray ====
A chest X-ray takes a picture of the heart and lungs. It may show air or fluid in the pleural space. It also may show the cause (e.g., pneumonia, a fractured rib, or a lung tumor) of the pleurisy.

Sometimes an X-ray is taken while lying on the painful side. This may show fluid, as well as changes in fluid position, that did not appear in the vertical X-ray.

==== Blood test ====
Blood tests can detect bacterial or viral infections, pneumonia, rheumatic fever, a pulmonary embolism, or lupus.

==== ECG ====
Electrocardiography test can determine if a heart condition contributes to the symptoms.

==== Ultrasound ====
Ultrasonography uses sound waves to create an image. It may show where fluid is located in the chest. It also can show some tumors. Although ultrasound may detect fluid around the lungs, also known as a pleural effusion, sound waves are scattered by air. Therefore, an actual picture of the lungs cannot be obtained with ultrasonography.

==== Computed tomography (CT) scan ====
A CT scan provides a computer-generated picture of the lungs that can show pockets of fluid. It also may show signs of pneumonia, a lung abscess, or a tumor.

==== Magnetic resonance imaging (MRI) ====
Magnetic resonance imaging (MRI), also called nuclear magnetic resonance (NMR) scanning, uses powerful magnets to show pleural effusions and tumors.

==== Arterial blood gas ====
In arterial blood-gas sampling, a small amount of blood is taken from an artery, usually in the wrist. The blood is then checked for oxygen and carbon-dioxide levels. This test shows how well the lungs are taking in oxygen.

==== Thoracentesis ====
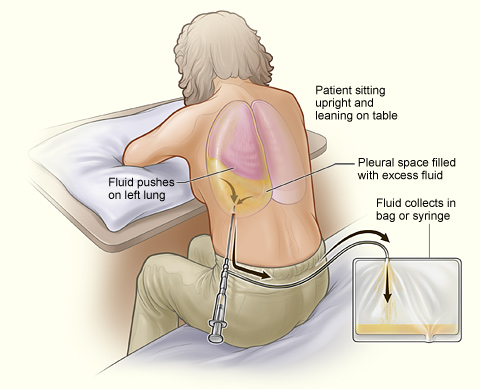
The illustration shows a person undergoing thoracentesis. The person sits upright and leans on a table. Excess fluid from the pleural space is drained into a bag.

Once the presence of an excess fluid in the pleural cavity, or pleural effusion, is suspected and location of fluid is confirmed, a sample of fluid can be removed for testing. The procedure to remove fluid in the chest is called a diagnostic thoracentesis. The doctor inserts a small needle or a thin, hollow, plastic tube in the chest wall and withdraws fluid.

Thoracentesis can be done in the doctor's office or at the hospital. Ultrasound is used to guide the needle to the fluid that is trapped in small pockets around the lungs.

Thoracentesis usually does not cause serious complications. Generally, a chest x-ray is done after the procedure to evaluate the lungs. Possible complications of thoracentesis include the following:

- Bleeding and bruising where the needle went in. In rare cases, bleeding may occur in or around the lung. The doctor can use a chest tube to drain the blood. In some cases, surgery is needed.
- Infection where the needle went in
- Injury to the liver or spleen (in rare cases)
- Pain.
- Pneumothorax, or buildup of air in the pleural space, with a collapsed or partially collapsed lung. Sometimes air comes in through the needle or the needle makes a hole in the lung. Usually, a hole seals itself—but sometimes air builds up around the lung and makes it collapse. A chest tube removes the air and lets the lung expand again.

The lung fluid is examined under a microscope and is evaluated for the presence of chemicals and for its color and texture. The degree of clarity is an indicator of infection, cancer, or other conditions that may be causing the buildup of fluid or blood in the pleural space.

==== Biopsy ====
If tuberculosis or cancer is suspected, a small piece of the pleura may be examined under a microscope to make a definitive diagnosis. This is called a biopsy.

Several approaches to taking tissue samples are available

1. Insertion of a needle through the skin on the chest to remove a small sample of the outer layer of the pleura
2. Insertion of a small tube with a light on the end (endoscope) into tiny cuts in the chest wall to visualize the pleura, and biopsy of small pieces of tissue through the endoscope
3. Removal of a sample of the pleura through a small cut in the chest wall (open pleural biopsy), usually done if the sample from the needle biopsy is too small for accurate diagnosis

== Treatment ==
Treatment has several goals:

- Relief of symptoms
- Removal of the fluid, air, or blood from the pleural space
- Treatment of the underlying condition

=== Procedures ===
If large amounts of fluid, air, or blood are not removed from the pleural space, they may cause the lung to collapse.

The surgical procedures used to drain fluid, air, or blood from the pleural space are as follows:

- During thoracentesis, a needle or a thin, hollow, plastic tube is inserted through the ribs in the back of the chest into the chest wall. A syringe is attached to draw fluid out of the chest. This procedure can remove more than 6 cups (1,500 mL) of fluid at a time.
- When larger amounts of fluid must be removed, a chest tube may be inserted through the chest wall. The doctor injects a local anesthetic into the area of the chest wall outside where the fluid is. A plastic tube is then inserted into the chest between two ribs. The tube is connected to a box that suctions the fluid out. A chest x-ray is taken to check the tube's position.
- A chest tube is also used to drain blood and air from the pleural space. This can take several days. The tube is left in place, and the patient usually stays in the hospital during this time.
- Sometimes the fluid contains thick pus or blood clots, or it may have formed a hard skin or peel. This makes it harder to drain the fluid. To help break up the pus or blood clots, the doctor may use the chest tube to put certain medicines into the pleural space. These medicines are called fibrinolytics. If the pus or blood clots still do not drain out, surgery may be necessary.

=== Medications ===
A couple of medications are used to relieve pleurisy symptoms:

- Paracetamol (acetaminophen) or anti-inflammatory agents to control pain and decrease inflammation. Only indomethacin (brand name Indocin) has been studied with respect to relief of pleurisy.
- Codeine-based cough syrups to control the cough

There may be a role for the use of corticosteroids (for tuberculous pleurisy), tacrolimus (Prograf) and methotrexate (Trexall, Rheumatrex) in the treatment of pleurisy. Further studies are needed.

=== Lifestyle changes ===
The following may be helpful in the management of pleurisy:

- Lying on the painful side may be more comfortable
- Breathing deeply and coughing to clear mucus as the pain eases. Otherwise, pneumonia may develop.
- Getting rest

=== Treating the cause ===
Ideally, the treatment of pleurisy is aimed at eliminating the underlying cause of the disease.

- If the pleural fluid is infected, treatment involves antibiotics and draining the fluid. If the infection is tuberculosis or from a fungus, treatment involves long-term use of antibiotics or antifungal medicines.
- If the fluid is caused by tumors of the pleura, it may build up again quickly after it is drained. Sometimes anti-tumor medicines prevent further fluid buildup. If they do not, the doctor may seal the pleural space. This is called pleurodesis. Pleurodesis involves the drainage of all the fluid out of the chest through a chest tube. A substance is inserted through the chest tube into the pleural space. This substance irritates the surface of the pleura. This causes the two layers of the pleurae to squeeze shut so there is no room for more fluid to build up.
- Chemotherapy or radiation treatment also may be used to reduce the size of the tumors.
- If congestive heart failure is causing the fluid buildup, treatment usually includes diuretics and other medicines.

The treatment for pleurisy depends on its origin and is prescribed by a physician on a base of an individual assessment. Paracetamol (acetaminophen) and amoxicillin, or other antibiotics in case of bacterial infections, are common remedies dispensed by doctors to relieve the initial symptoms and pain in the chest, while viral infections are self-limited. Non-steroidal anti-inflammatory drugs (NSAIDs), preferably indometacin, are usually employed as pain control agents.

=== Alternative treatments ===
A number of alternative or complementary medicines are being investigated for their anti-inflammatory properties, and their use in pleurisy. At this time, clinical trials of these compounds have not been performed.

Extracts from the Brazilian folk remedy Wilbrandia ebracteata ("Taiuia") have been shown to reduce inflammation in the pleural cavity of mice. The extract is thought to inhibit the same enzyme, cyclooxygenase-2 (COX-2), as the non-steroidal anti-inflammatory drugs.

== Prognosis ==
Pleurisy, and other disorders of the pleurae, can be serious, depending on what caused them. Generally, pleurisy treatment has an excellent prognosis, but if left untreated it can cause severe complications. For example, a resulting pulmonary heart disease, cor pulmonale, which manifests itself in an inflammation of the arms and legs, can lead to heart failure. If the conditions that caused the pleurisy or other pleural disorders were adequately diagnosed and treated early, one can expect a full recovery. Help of a pulmonologist (respiratory physician in the U.K. and Australia) may be enlisted to deal with the underlying cause, and chart post-illness rehabilitation.
