= Subdural empyema =

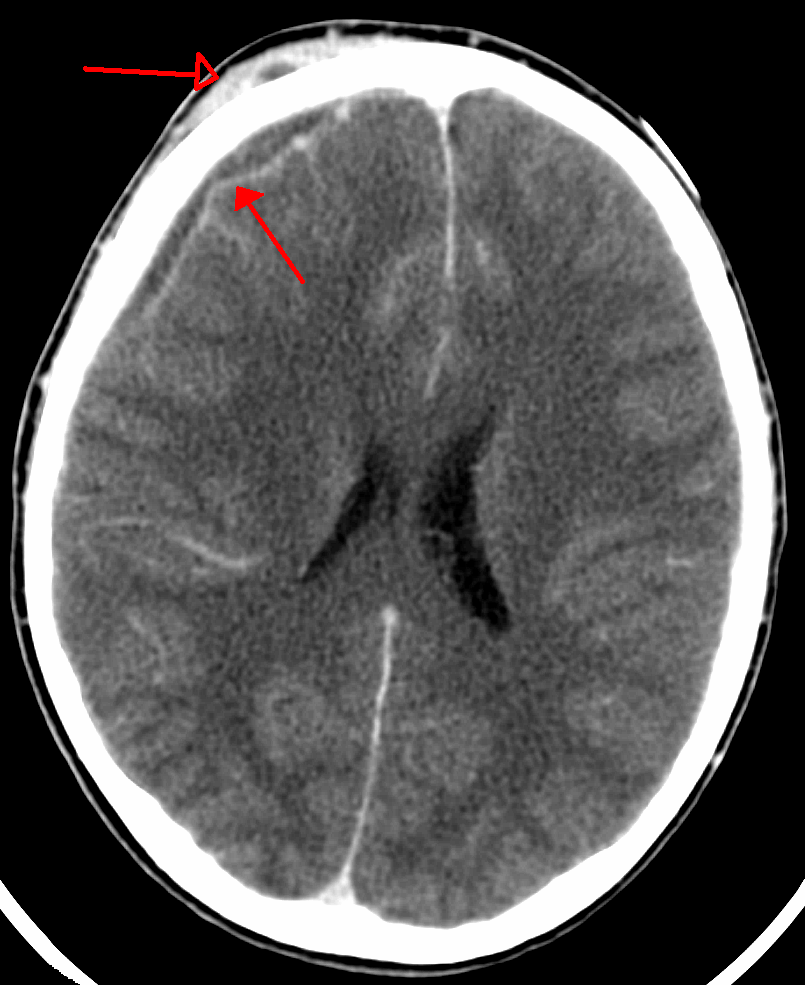
- An abscess that has led to an intracranial subdural empyema as seen on CT
- Specialty: Neurology

Subdural empyema is a form of empyema – a collection of pus, in the subdural space.

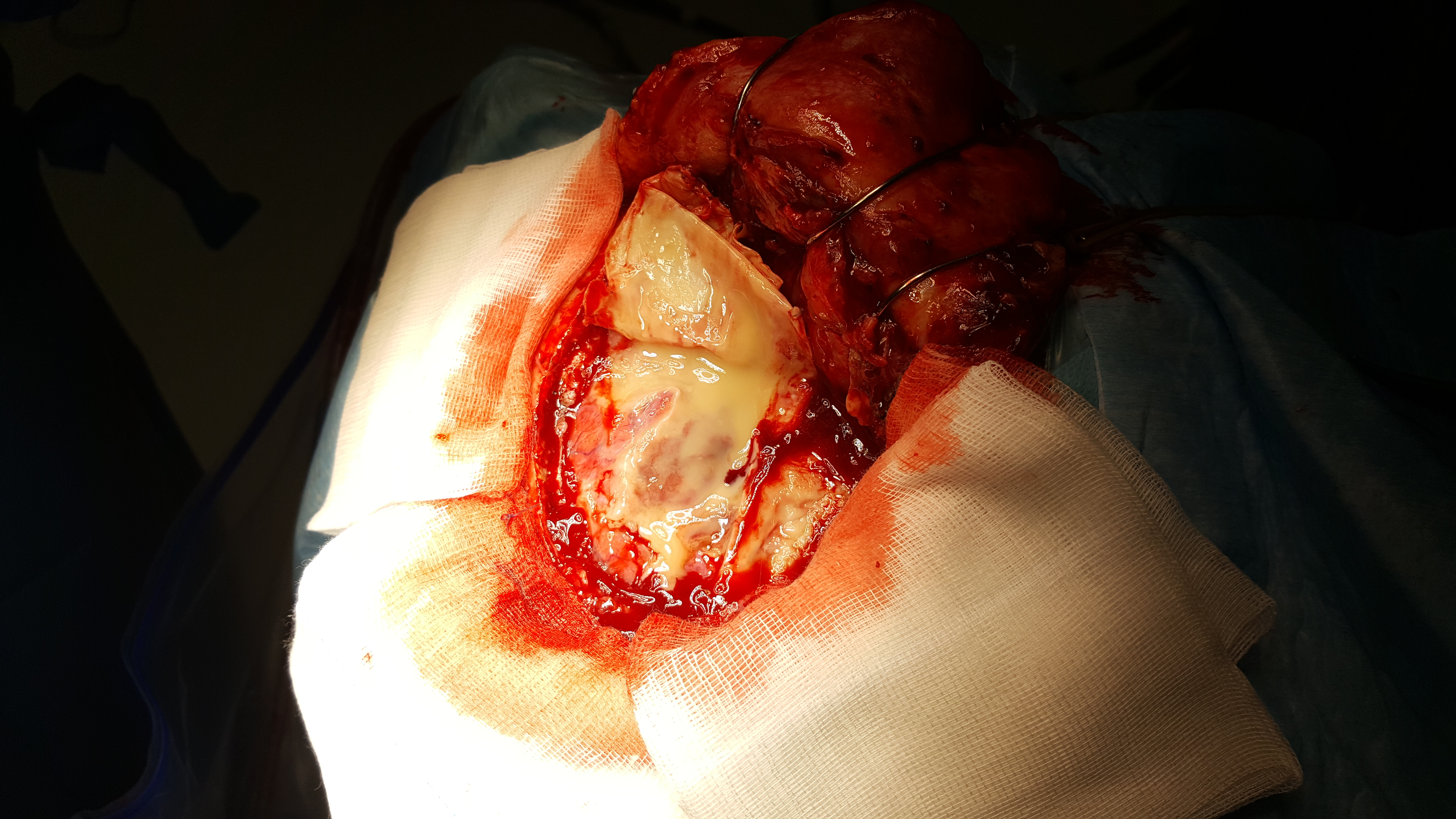
Subdural empyema

Bacterial or occasionally fungal infection of the skull bones or air sinuses can spread to the subdural space, producing a subdural empyema. The underlying arachnoid and subarachnoid spaces are usually unaffected, but a large subdural empyema may produce a mass effect. Further, a thrombophlebitis may develop in the bridging veins that cross the subdural space, resulting in venous occlusion and infarction of the brain. With treatment, including surgical drainage, resolution of the empyema occurs from the dural side, and, if it is complete, a thickened dura may be the only residual finding. Symptoms include those referable to the source of the infection. In addition, most patients are febrile, with headache and neck stiffness, and, if untreated, may develop focal neurologic signs, lethargy, and coma. The CSF profile is similar to that seen in brain abscesses, because both are parameningeal infectious processes. If diagnosis and treatment are prompt, complete recovery is usual.

It usually occurs in infancy. It can be associated with sinusitis.
