= Polytrauma =

Severe injuries from multiple traumas

Polytrauma and multiple trauma are medical terms describing the condition of a person who has been subjected to multiple traumatic injuries, such as a serious head injury in addition to a serious burn. The term is defined via an Injury Severity Score (ISS) equal to or greater than 16. It has become a commonly applied term by US military physicians in describing the seriously injured soldiers returning from Operation Iraqi Freedom in Iraq and Operation Enduring Freedom in Afghanistan. The term is generic, however, and has been in use for a long time for any case involving multiple trauma.

== Civilian medicine ==
In civilian life, polytraumas often are associated with motor vehicle crashes. This is because car crashes often occur at high velocities, causing multiple injuries. On admission to hospital any trauma patient should immediately undergo x-ray diagnosis of their cervical spine, chest, and pelvis, commonly known as a 'trauma series', to ascertain possible life-threatening injuries. (Where available, a CT trauma series for head, neck, thorax, abdomen and pelvis may be the imaging modality of first choice). Examples would be a fractured cervical vertebra, a severely fractured pelvis, or a haemothorax. Once this initial survey is complete, x-rays may be taken of the limbs to assess the possibility of other fractures. It also is quite common in severe trauma for patients to be sent directly to CT or a surgery theatre, if they require emergency treatment.

Extracorporeal membrane oxygenation (ECMO) may be effective in treating some polytrauma patients with pulmonary or cardiopulmonary failure.

== Military medicine ==
Polytrauma often results from blast injuries sustained from improvised explosive devices, or by a hit with a rocket-propelled grenade, with "Improvised explosive devices, blasts, landmines, and fragments account[ing] for 65 percent of combat injuries ...". The combination of high-pressure waves, explosive fragments, and falling debris may produce multiple injuries including brain injury, loss of limbs, burns, fractures, blindness, and hearing loss, with 60 percent of those injured in this way, having some degree of traumatic brain injury.

In some respects, the high incidence of polytrauma in military medicine is, in fact, a sign of medical advancement. In previous wars most soldiers with such multiple injuries simply did not survive, even if quickly transferred into hospital care. Today many polytrauma victims never fully regain their previous physical capacity, and are more susceptible to psychological complications, such as PTSD.

=== U.S. treatment ===
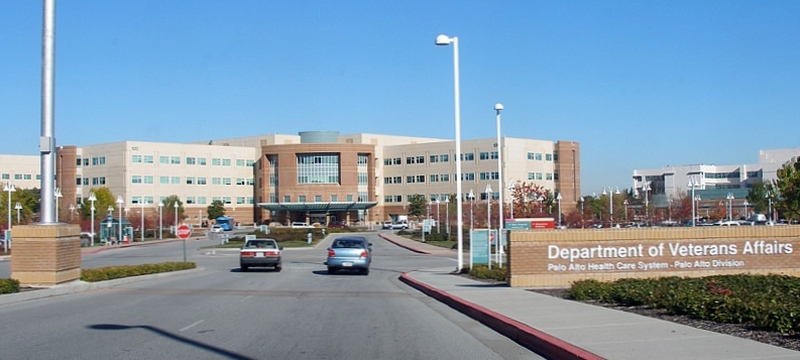
One of the U.S. clinics specialising in polytrauma, this one in Palo Alto

As of 2013, there were five rehabilitation centers in the U.S. specialising in polytrauma. They are managed by the United States Department of Veterans Affairs and are located in Minneapolis, Minnesota; Palo Alto, California; Richmond, Virginia; San Antonio, Texas, and Tampa, Florida. In addition to the intensive care, insofar as still required, these hospitals mainly specialize in rehabilitative treatment. In addition the Department of Veterans Affairs has 22 polytrauma network sites, located throughout the country.

Veterans Health Administration (VHA) developed a screening and evaluation process to ensure that OEF/OIF/OND Veterans with TBI are identified, and that they receive appropriate treatments and services. This includes mandatory screening for deployment-related TBI of all OEF/OIF/OND Veterans upon their initial entry into VHA for services. Veterans with positive screens are referred for a comprehensive evaluation by TBI specialists for diagnostic and treatment recommendations.

Based on extensive research, the VA-TBI Screening Tool has revealed high sensitivity and moderate specificity allowing VA to identify symptomatic Veterans and develop an appropriate plan of care. From 2007 to 2015, over 900,000 Veterans have been screened for possible OEF/OIF/OND deployment related TBI. Of those, approximately 20 percent had positive screens and were referred for further evaluation.

=== Epidemiology ===
OEF/OIF/OND veterans have a high polytrauma rate. Respectfully, a study exhibited findings with a population of 16,590 OEF/OIF/OND veterans, in which 27.66% met the criteria for poly trauma. Those within this subpopulation were most likely male (92.9%) and White (71.0%). Similar findings in a sample of 2,441,698 OEF/OIF/OND active duty found that the rate of poly trauma was 5.99 per 1,000 individuals. Of those with polytrauma, 52.15% were most likely between the ages of 20–29 years, male (89.93%), White (69.07%), married (64.18%), and enlisted in the Army (74.71%). Furthermore, the rate of polytrauma among a sample of 613,391 OEF/OIF/OND veterans was 6% (36,800). Additional research has concluded that in a selection of 340 OEF/OIF/OND veterans, 42.1% exhibited symptoms of poly trauma.

As of April 2007, the Department of Veterans Affairs has treated more than 350 service members in their inpatient centers.

The treatment and rehabilitative care for polytrauma patients is extensive and laborious. The recommended staffing numbers (FTE = Full Time Equivalent) for six rehabilitation treatment beds are:

- 0.5 FTE – Physician Discipline FTE Rehabilitation
- 5.5 FTE – Registered Nurse (1.0 must be CRRN)
- 4.0 FTE – Licensed Practical Nurse and/or Certified Nursing Assistant
- 0.5 FTE – Nurse Manager
- 0.5 FTE – Clinical Case Manager, Admission and Follow-up
- 1.0 FTE – Social Worker Case Manager
- 0.5 FTE – Social Worker
- 1.0 FTE – Speech-Language Pathologist
- 1.0 FTE – Physical Therapist
- 1.0 FTE – Occupational Therapist
- 0.5 FTE – Recreation Therapist
- 0.5 FTE – Counseling Psychologist
- 0.5 FTE – Neuropsychologist

In other words, 2.8 people are required full-time (24h), for every patient, often for months, while some care may be required for life.
