= Axillary lines =

Imaginary line for orientation on the lateral aspect of the thorax and abdomen

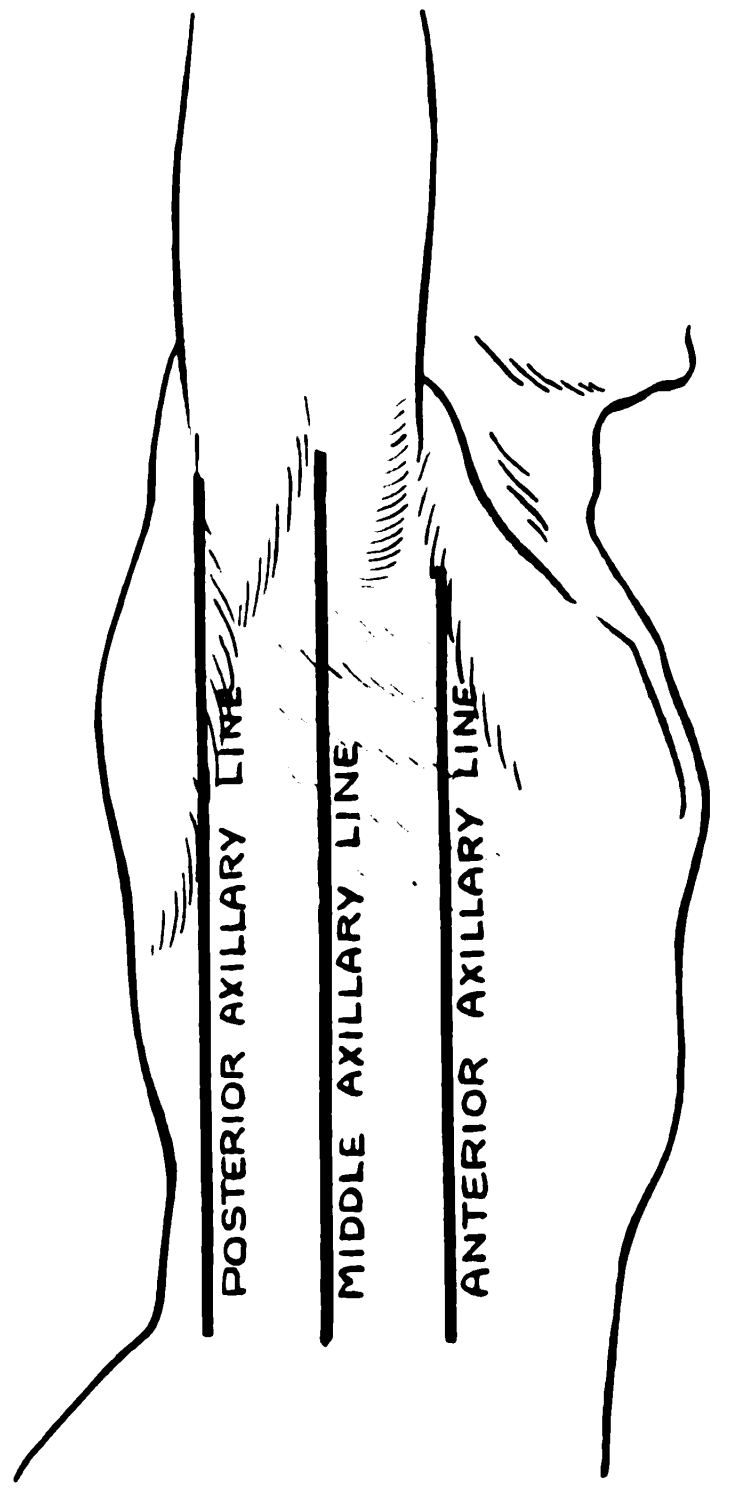
- The right side of the thorax with lines labeled

Details

Identifiers
- Latin: lineae axillares
- FMA: 20258

The axillary lines are the anterior axillary line, midaxillary line and the posterior axillary line.

The anterior axillary line is a coronal line on the anterior torso marked by the anterior axillary fold. It's the imaginary line that runs down from the point midway between the middle of the clavicle and the lateral end of the clavicle.

The V_{5} ECG lead is placed on the left anterior axillary line, horizontally even with V_{4}.

The midaxillary line is a coronal line on the torso between the anterior and posterior axillary lines.

It is a landmark used in thoracentesis, and the V6 electrode of the 10 electrode ECG.

The posterior axillary line is a coronal line on the posterior torso marked by the posterior axillary fold.

== Additional images ==
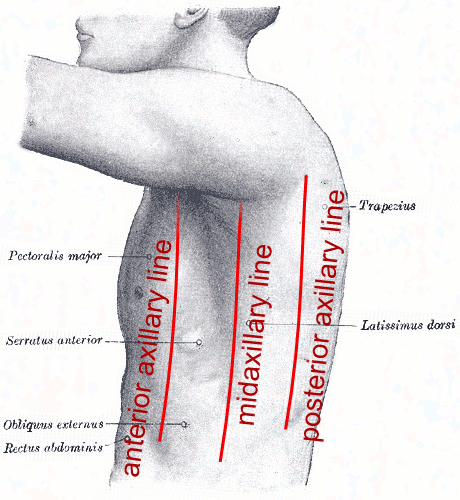
The left side of the thorax with lines labeled

== See also ==
- List of anatomical lines
