= Decortication =

Surgical removal of a protective outer layer of an organ

- ICD-9-CM: 34.51-34.52

Decortication is a medical procedure involving the surgical removal of the surface layer, membrane, or fibrous cover of an organ. The procedure is usually performed when the lung is covered by a thick, inelastic pleural peel restricting lung expansion. In a non-medical aspect, decortication is the removal of the bark, husk, or outer layer, or peel of an object. It may also be done in the treatment of chronic laryngitis. It is the primary treatment for fibrothorax.

== Procedure ==
Decortication is performed under general anaesthesia. It is a major thoracic operation that has traditionally required a full thoracotomy. Since the early 1990s this procedure has increasingly been performed using more minimally invasive thoracoscopy. All fibrous tissue is removed from the visceral pleural peel and pus is subsequently drained from the pleural space.

== Contraindications ==
Other than the overall health of the patients, there are no absolute contraindications. In some lung-disease patients, the lung will not expand after removal of the pleural peel, rendering the surgery futile. Other diseases that render decortication futile are narrowing of the large airway stenosis and uncontrolled pleural infection. With these conditions, the lung will not expand to fill the thorax space. A major surgery called a pleuropneumonectomy can be the only available option, but only if the patient has been worked up before the surgery. Pleuropneumonectomy is a major surgery with a very high mortality and high invasiveness.
