= Vacuum-assisted breast biopsy =

- Purpose: diagnose breast cancer

Vacuum-assisted breast biopsy (VAB) is a minimally invasive procedure (biopsy) to help in the diagnosis of breast cancer. VAB is characterized by single insertion, acquisition of contiguous and larger tissue samples, and directional sample capability. It also offers 10x the tissue of core needle biopsy.
