= Bronchopleural fistula =

Abnormal lung–pleural space connection

A bronchopleural fistula (BPF) is a fistula between the pleural space and the lung. It can develop following pneumonectomy, lung ablation, post-traumatically, or with certain types of infection. It may also develop when large airways are in communication with the pleural space following a large pneumothorax or other loss of pleural negative pressure, especially during positive pressure mechanical ventilation. On imaging, the diagnosis is suspected indirectly on radiograph. Increased gas in the pneumonectomy operative bed, or new gas within a loculated effusion are highly suggestive of the diagnosis. Infectious causes include tuberculosis, Actinomyces israelii, Nocardia, and Blastomyces dermatitidis. Malignancy and trauma can also result in the abnormal communication.
