= Stereotactic biopsy =

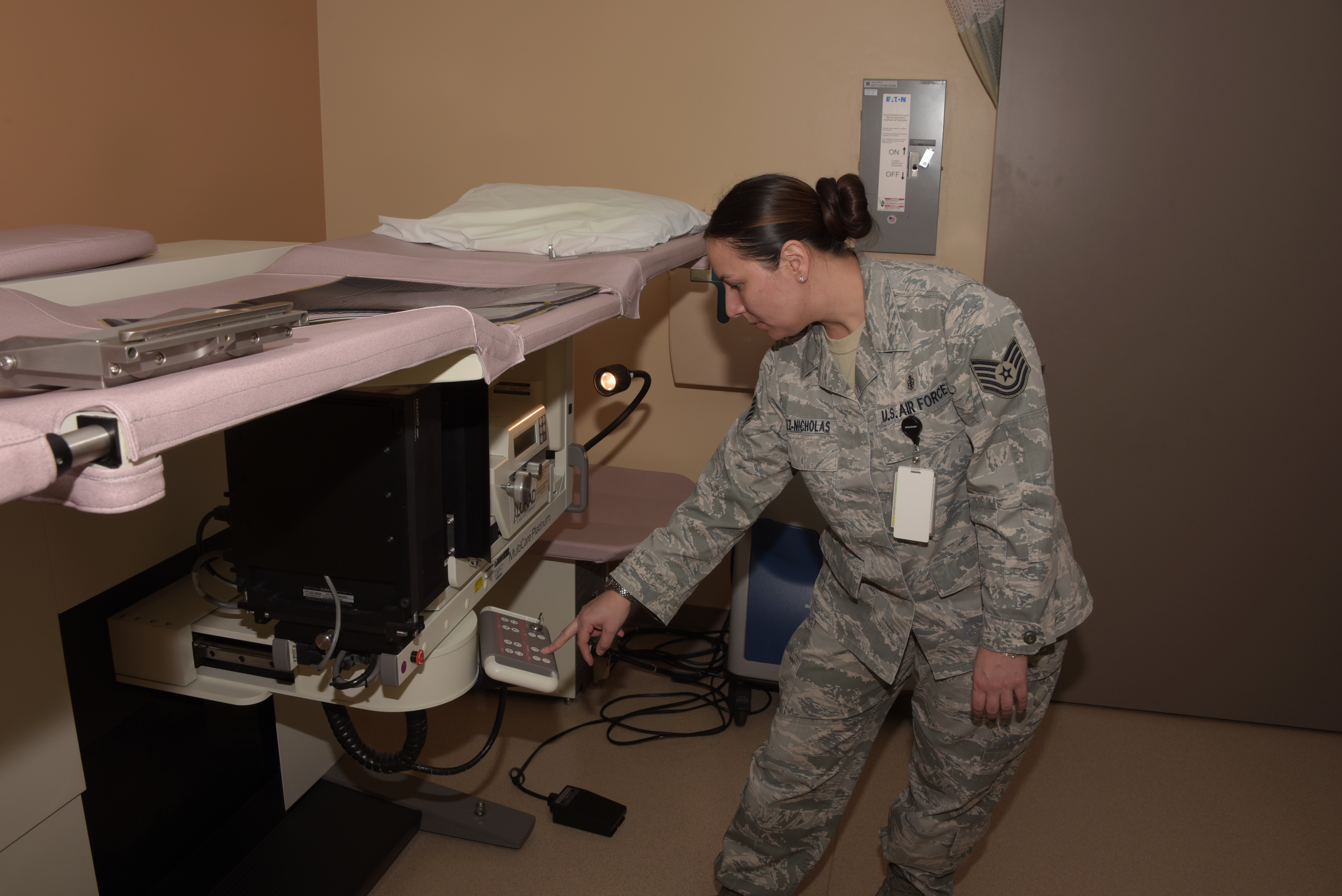
Tech. Sgt. Shirley Velez-Nicholas, 60th Medical Diagnostics and Therapeutics Squadron, performs an equipment check on the stereotactic biopsy table inside David Grant USAF Medical Center at Travis Air Force Base, Calif., March 1, 2018.

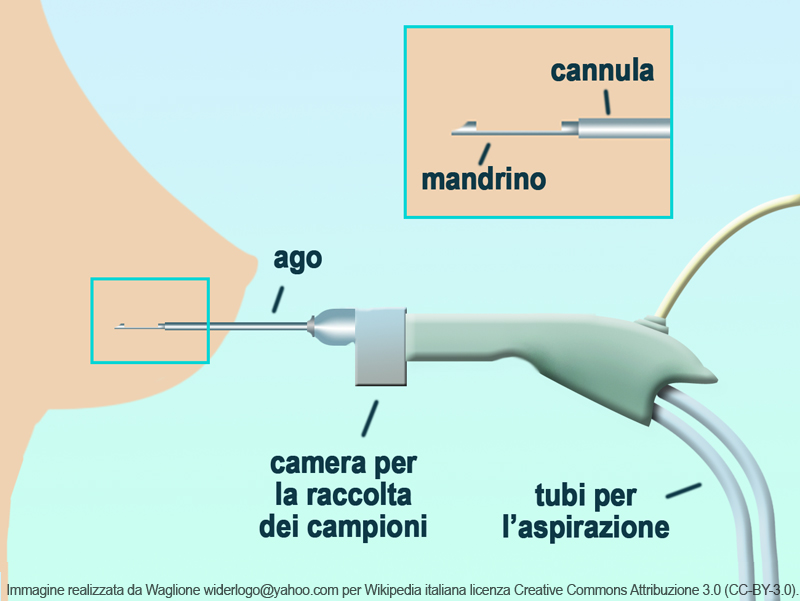
Vacuum-assisted biopsy probe (Mammotome) used in stereotactic biopsy of a breast mass.

Stereotactic biopsy, also known as stereotactic core biopsy, is a biopsy procedure that uses a computer and imaging performed in at least two planes to localize a target lesion (such as a tumor or microcalcifications in the breast) in three-dimensional space and guide the removal of tissue for examination by a pathologist under a microscope. Stereotactic core biopsy makes use of the underlying principle of parallax to determine the depth or "Z-dimension" of the target lesion.

Stereotactic core biopsy is extensively used by radiologists specializing in breast imaging to obtain tissue samples containing microcalcifications, which can be an early sign of breast cancer.

== Uses ==
X-ray-guided stereotactic biopsy is used for impalpable lesions (cannot be felt manually) that are also not visible on ultrasound.

A stereotactic biopsy may be used, with x-ray guidance, for performing a fine needle aspiration for cytology and needle core biopsy to evaluate a breast lesion. However, that type of biopsy is also sometimes performed without any imaging guidance, and typically, stereotactic guidance is used for core biopsies or vacuum-assisted mammotomy.

Stereotactic core biopsy is necessary for evaluating atypical appearing calcifications found on mammogram of the breast. If the calcifications exhibit the classic "teacup" appearance of benign fibrocystic changes, then a biopsy is usually not necessary.
