= Empyema =

Accumulation of pus in a bodily cavity

- Specialty: Pulmonology, infectious disease

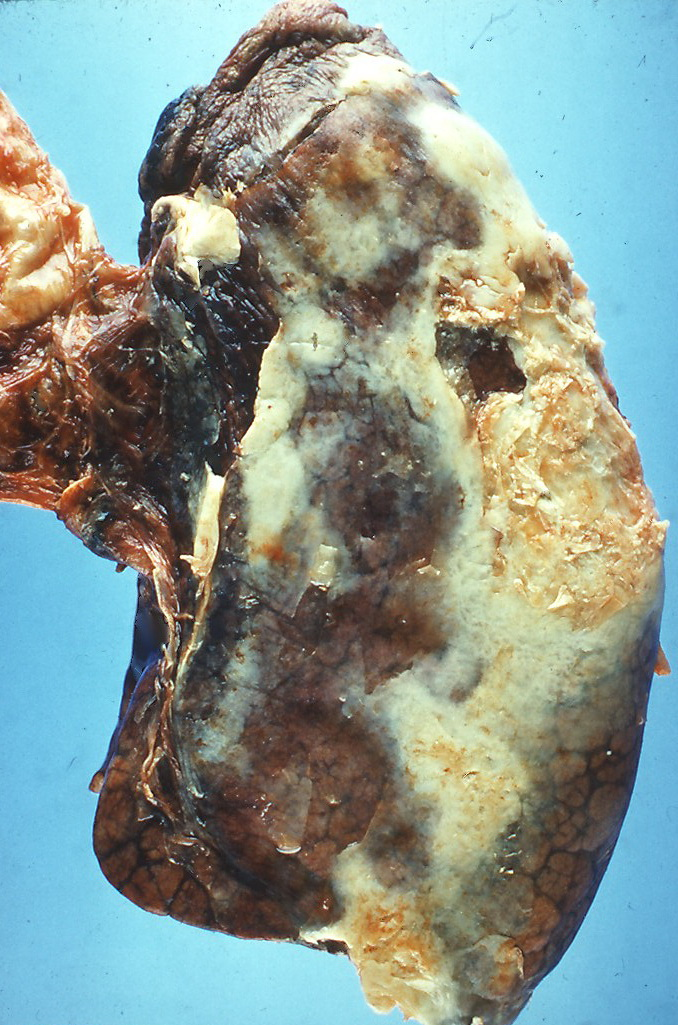
Empyema

An empyema (/ˌɛmpaɪˈiːmə/; from Ancient Greek ἐμπύημα (empúēma) 'abscess') is a collection or gathering of pus within a naturally existing anatomical cavity. The term is most commonly used to refer to pleural empyema, which is empyema of the pleural cavity. It is similar to or the same as abscess in meaning, but the context of use may sometimes be different. For instance, an appendicular empyema is in medicine now generally called an abscess.

Empyema most commonly occurs as a complication of pneumonia but can also result from other infections or conditions that lead to the collection of infected fluid in a body cavity.

== Classification ==
Empyema occurs in:

- the pleural cavity (pleural empyema also known as pyothorax)
- the thoracic cavity
- the uterus (pyometra)
- the appendix (appendicitis)
- the meninges (subdural empyema)
- the joints (septic arthritis)
- the gallbladder

== Diagnosis ==
Chest X-rays or computed tomography (CT) scans can reveal the presence of fluid within the pleural space and help assess its characteristics. Once a fluid-filled cavity has been identified, it is often partially or fully drained with a needle, so that the fluid may be analyzed. This helps determine whether the fluid is infected and allows for the identification of the causative microorganisms. Blood tests may also be performed, which can identify both an elevated neutrophil count, which is indicative of an infection, or bacteremia.

In addition to CT, suspected cases of empyema in and around the brain are often subjected to more rigorous neuroimaging techniques, including MRI. In these cases, fluid samples are obtained via stereotactic needles rather than lumbar puncture, because unlike most cases of meningitis, a lumbar puncture will most often not reveal anything about the causative microorganisms.
