= United Kingdom Model for End-Stage Liver Disease =

Medical scoring system in liver disease

The United Kingdom Model for End-Stage Liver Disease or UKELD is a medical scoring system used to predict the prognosis of patients with chronic liver disease. It is used in the United Kingdom to help determine the need for liver transplantation. It was developed from the MELD score, incorporating the serum sodium level.

== Determination ==
The UKELD score is calculated from the patient's INR, serum creatinine, serum bilirubin and serum sodium, according to the formula:

$(5.395 \times \ln INR) + (1.485 \times \ln creatinine) + (3.13 \times \ln bilirubin) - (81.565 \times \ln Na) + 435$

== Interpretation ==
Higher UKELD scores equate to higher one-year mortality risk. A UKELD score of 49 indicates a 9% one-year risk of mortality, and is the minimum score required to be added to the liver transplant waiting list in the U.K. A UKELD score of 60 indicates a 50% chance of one-year survival.

== History ==
The UKELD score was developed in 2008 to aid in the selection of patients for liver transplantation in the U.K.

== See also ==
- Model for End-Stage Liver Disease
- MELD-Plus
- Pediatric End-Stage Liver Disease
- Milan criteria
- Child-Pugh score
