= Hepatic hydrothorax =

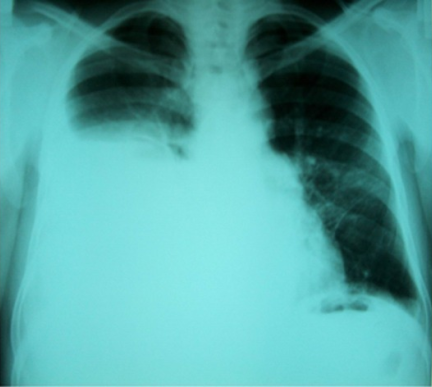
- Chest X-ray showing a hepatic hydrothorax in a person with cirrhosis
- Symptoms: Cough, shortness of breath, and respiratory failure
- Causes: Liver cirrhosis, ascites
- Diagnostic method: Pleural fluid analysis
- Treatment: Medical management, thoracentesis, liver transplant, palliative care
- Prognosis: Poor

Hepatic hydrothorax is a rare form of pleural effusion that occurs in people with liver cirrhosis. It is defined as an effusion of over 500 mL in people with liver cirrhosis that is not caused by heart, lung, or pleural disease. It is found in 5–10% of people with liver cirrhosis and 2–3% of people with pleural effusions. In cases of decompensated liver cirrhosis, prevalence rises significantly up to 90%. Over 85% of cases occurring on the right, 13% on the left, and 2% on both. Although it is most common in people with severe ascites, it can also occur in people with mild or no ascites. Symptoms are not specific and mostly involve the respiratory system.

The condition is diagnosed based on the existence of liver cirrhosis and fluid build-up in the abdomen (ascites) and analysis of the fluid. The fluid has a low protein content. Mainly, the condition is treated by medical management, such as diet adjustment and usage of diuretics. When the condition does not respond, it is known as refractory hepatic hydrothorax: treatment includes inserting a transjugular intrahepatic portosystemic shunt (TIPS). The only curative treatment is a liver transplant. The prognosis is usually unfavorable, especially in refractory cases, due to the majority of people being unsuitable for transplantation. However, transplantation indicates a favorable prognosis; one case study showed that the condition had no effect on post-transplant outcomes.

== Symptoms ==
The condition has no specific symptoms, as it occurs with ascites and other manifestations of increased pressure in the portal vein caused by liver disease. Pleural fluid causes symptoms far more easily than ascitic fluid, due to the lower volume of the pleural cavity as compared to the abdominal cavity. The main symptoms are usually related to the symptoms of liver cirrhosis and ascites. Less often, it may be the only manifestation of chronic liver disease. The symptoms depend on many factors, such as the effusion's volume, how fast it accumulates, and the presence of cardiopulmonary disease. The condition may cause no symptoms and be incidentally detected by medical scans, or it may cause large pleural effusions that result in respiratory symptoms like cough, shortness of breath, low blood oxygen, and respiratory failure. In general, people are more sensitive to pleural effusions then ascites; much smaller effusions can cause symptoms. Most people have progressive difficulty breathing and reduced exercise tolerance. Rarely, there may be acute cases that accumulate fluid rapidly and result in circulatory collapse.

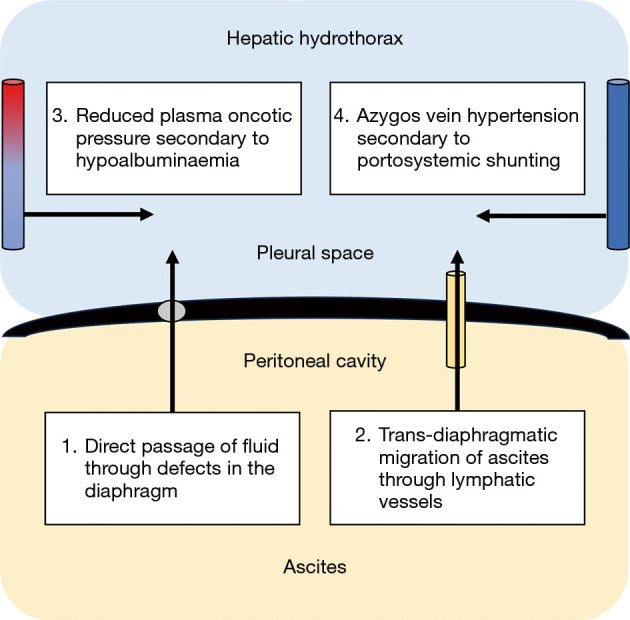
Chart showing the potential causative mechanisms of the condition.

== Causes ==
The condition is caused by portal hypertension resulting from liver disease. The causative mechanism is unknown, but several have been proposed, which are similar to those behind ascites. The most accepted theory is that fluid originating from ascites travels through defects in the diaphragm into the pleural cavity. These defects exist in the normal population. The defects are usually less than 1 centimetre (0.39 in) and are more common on the right side, possibly because of the increased prevalence of tendon tissue from its proximity to the liver. Through a microscope, they look like discontinuities in the bundles of collagen that make up the tendon part of the diaphragm. In hepatic hydrothorax, the pressure created by ascites and the thinning of the diaphragm caused by malnutrition cause the defects to become larger. Blebs of peritoneum can herniate through these defects; if they burst, a pleuroperitoneal communication is created. Fluid moves from the abdomen to the pleural cavity via a pressure gradient between the cavities. If the fluid accumulates faster than it can leave via pleural membrane absorption, hepatic hydrothorax results.

== Diagnosis ==
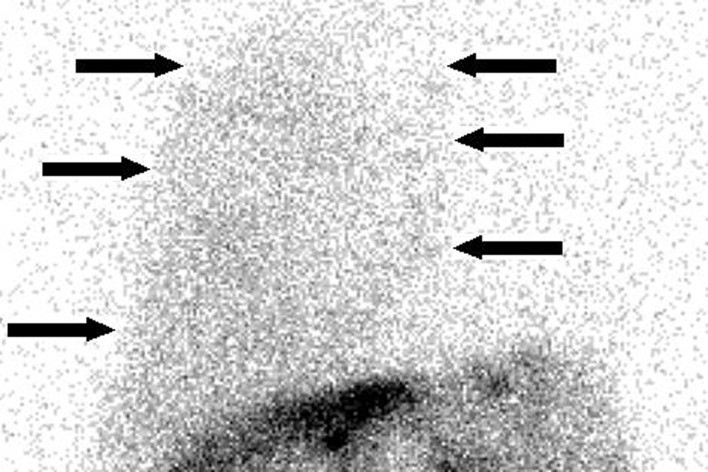
Peritoneal scintigraphy showing tracer in the pleural and abdominal cavities, suggesting a pleuroperitoneal communication consistent with hepatic hydrothorax

The most noticeable symptoms are usually those of cirrhosis and portal hypertension. Most affected people show signs of end-stage liver disease. Diagnosis involves extracting the fluid via thoracentesis; after this, the fluid is analyzed to diagnose and rule out other causes. The fluid can be analyzed for serum, protein, albumin, lactate dehydrogenase, and cell count. The fluid is a transudate and similar to fluid found in ascites. There may be a higher protein and albumin content in hepatic hydrothorax due to the pleura absorbing the water. To rule out heart-related causes of pleural effusion, an echocardiogram can be performed. Pleuroperitoneal communications are best detected by peritoneal scintigraphy. Hydrothorax without ascites has been reported to occur in as many as 20% of people with cirrhosis but is only detected in 7% of cases via CT scan and ultrasound.

The condition can be mistaken for a chylothorax, which can also occur in people with cirrhosis. Additionally, the fluid in chylothorax is much higher in triglycerides, and has a milky appearance. Another, more serious differential diagnosis, is spontaneous bacterial empyema, carrying a high death rate even with treatment. However, the fluid has a much higher neutrophil concentration than in hepatic hydrothorax. Spontaneous bacterial empyema can occur even without ascites. Additionally, there may be other symptoms of infection, such as fever.

== Management ==
As the condition is caused by leaking ascitic fluid, treatment centers around managing ascites and decompensated liver disease. Some individuals respond to medical management. In up to 26% of cases, the condition does not respond to medical management, in which case it is known as a refractory hepatic hydrothorax. For these individuals, the first treatment of choice is the insertion of a transjugular intrahepatic portosystemic shunt. The only curative treatment is a liver transplant. Additionally, treatment involves addressing the underlying cause of the liver disease, such as alcohol use or viral hepatitis.

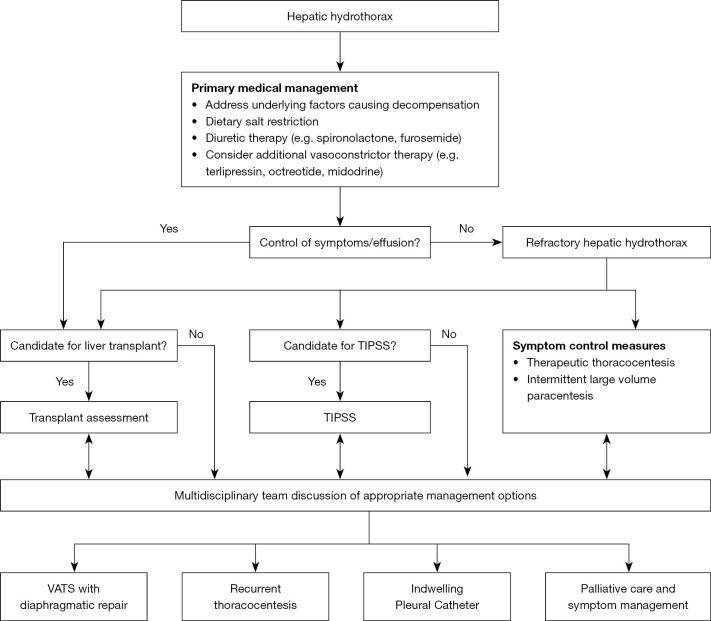
Treatment flowchart for hepatic hydrothorax

=== Medical management ===
Medical management is the main treatment. Although it is simple, cheap, and noninvasive, it has a high rate of failure and comes with a risk of acute kidney injury and kidney failure. Reducing sodium in the diet and using diuretics may help reduce ascites and stop the growth of the effusion. The goal of medical management is a low sodium diet of 70-90 mmol per day and to lose.5 kg/day of weight for patients without edema, and 1 kg/day for patients with edema. Usually, diet modification is not enough; then, diuretics are the next line of treatment. A distal agent and a loop diuretic can be used together to cause the kidneys to excrete least 120 mEq/day of sodium via urine. Aldosterone receptor antagonists like spironolactone work by reducing the absorption of sodium in distal kidney tubules. A loop diuretic is added if there is insufficient response. The amount of sodium excreted in urine is monitored before and during treatment to adjust diuretic dosage based on response. Additionally, vasoconstrictors, such as midodrine, may help increase salt output by the kidneys.

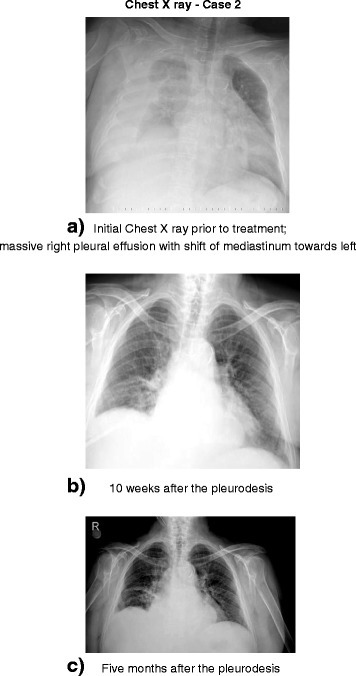
Hepatic hydrothorax after treatment with pleurodesis.

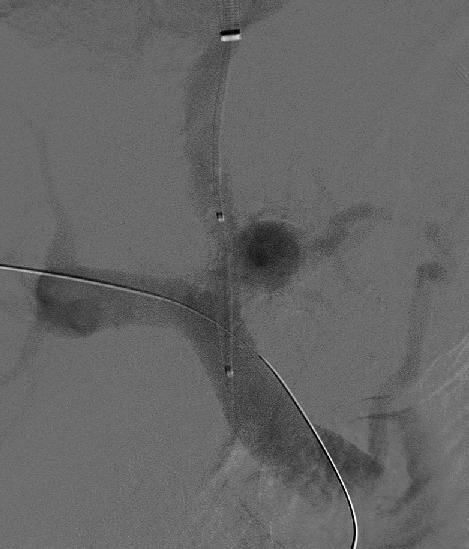
Fluoroscopic image of TIPS in progress

=== Refractory hepatic hydrothorax ===
For people with refractory hepatic hydrothorax, the only definite treatment is a liver transplant. However, the majority of people with this condition are unsuitable for transplantation, and the majority of those who have died awaiting it. However, other treatments can improve symptoms, increase survival, and, ideally, give time until a liver transplant is available. Suitability for liver transplantation is determined by the UKELD score; a score >49 indicates need for transplant listing. Additional indicators include empyema development and a failing synthetic liver.

==== Transjugular intrahepatic portosystemic shunt ====
The main treatment in those with refractory hepatic hydrothorax is the insertion of a transjugular intrahepatic portosystemic shunt (TIPS). TIPS decompresses the portal system, reducing portal venous pressure and fluid in the abdomen; it is estimated to work in 70-80% of cases. However, it does not improve the prognosis in those with end-stage liver disease. In people with serious liver dysfunction, TIPS may cause liver failure, as it shunts blood away from the liver.

==== Thoracentesis ====
Thoracentesis, though typically safe, only provides temporary benefit, as fluid tends to return quickly. Other possible complications may include pain, empyema, hemothorax, and subcutaneous emphysema. Repeat usage of thoracentesis increases the risk of complications; a review has indicated that the cumulative risk of complications such as pneumothorax and hemothorax approaches 12%. In cases with ascites, initially performing paracentesis to drain the ascitic fluid can help reduce the chance of recurrence.

==== Other treatments ====
In cases where TIPS is contraindicated, another treatment option is to insert an indwelling pleural catheter (IPC). Pleural treatments generally have a high complication rate; in a case study, those receiving IPC had greater complication rates despite undergoing significantly less procedures. As a last resort, pleurodesis can be used for people without ascites; by irritating the pleura together, it can repair any defects in the diaphragm. However, it requires multiple procedures and general anesthesia. Additionally, the amount of pleural fluid produced can overcome pleurodesis, causing it to fail. Complications may include empyema, sepsis, and septic shock. Chest tubes and intercostal chest drains are contraindicated, as they can cause loss of protein, infection, pneumothorax, hemothorax, and electrolyte imbalances. Additionally, removing them may pose a challenge, as the fluid returns extremely quickly afterward. Palliative care can also help with symptoms; for people resistant to disease-related treatment, no preferred methods exist to manage symptoms for this condition.

== Prognosis ==
Prognosis largely depends on the response to treatment. The median survival time for people with this condition is 8–12 months. The pleural fluid can become infected, resulting in spontaneous bacterial pleuritis. A Child-Pugh score greater than or equal to 10, MELD score greater than 15 and higher creatinine levels indicates an increased risk of death. Chest tube usage generally indicates a poor prognosis, with 1-year mortality rates of nearly 90% in one case study. However, if the person successfully responds to TIPS or liver transplantation, the prognosis can be more favorable; the condition does not affect post-transplantation outcomes.

== Epidemiology ==
The condition is found in 5–10% of those with cirrhosis and portal hypertension and 2–3% of all pleural effusions. It is most common in the presence of decompensated cirrhosis.
