= Thomas Walter Warnes =

British gastroenterologist (1938–2023)

Thomas Walter Warnes FRCP (1938 – 25 December 2023) was an English gastroenterologist.

== Life and career ==
Thomas Walter Warnes was born in 1938. He graduated from the University of Manchester in 1962 and took the MD in 1975. He had a particular interest in liver disease. The major contributions in his M.D Thesis included 1) The development of new techniques to separate and identify Alkaline phosphatase (ALP) isoenzymes in blood and duodenal juice; 2) The first demonstration of a hormonal action on an enzyme from the same tissue (small intestine); 3) The first demonstration of an entero-hepatic circulation of a glycoprotein enzyme. He became Senior Physician in the University Department of Gastroenterology at Manchester Royal Infirmary where he founded the Liver Unit. He was president of the North of England Gastroenterology Society; deputy director of The British Liver Trust and visiting professor in the Department of Biomolecular Sciences at the University of Manchester Institute of Science and Technology (UMIST).

Over his career, he contributed to numerous publications on hepatic fibrosis; Oxidant stress in chronic liver disease; Primary biliary cirrhosis (PBC); Portal hypertension; Development of new drug treatments for chronic liver disease (incl. the first trial of colchicine in PBC); Alkaline phosphatase isoenzymes; Hepatitis B & C; Tumour markers of primary liver cancer; Occupational liver disease. He published in prestigious peer-reviewed journals including: Journal of Hepatology; Hepatology (journal); Gut (journal); The American Journal of Human Genetics; The European Journal of Gastroenterology and Hepatology; The Lancet; British Medical Journal; Gastroenterology (journal); The New England Journal of Medicine,...).

Warnes died at home on 25 December 2023.
