= Page kidney =

- Other names: Page phenomena
- Specialty: Nephrology, hypertension
- Symptoms: Hypertension,
- Complications: Persistent hypertension, renal failure, loss of renal allograft
- Causes: Trauma, hematomas, masses, iatrogenic (post-procedural, post-surgical)
- Risk factors: Renal biopsies and other medical procedures, contact sports, motor vehicle collisions
- Diagnostic method: Imaging (ultrasound, CT)
- Treatment: Medical or surgical
- Medication: Antihypertensives [angiotensin-converting enzyme inhibitor (ACEi), angiotensin receptor blockers (ARB)]

Page kidney or Page phenomena is a potentially reversible form of secondary arterial hypertension caused by external compression of the renal parenchyma by some perirenal process. Any process that causes mass effect can be a potential cause of Page kidney. Hematomas, urinomas, tumors, cysts, lymphoceles, and aneurysms have all been reported in the literature. The compression is believed to cause activation of the renin–angiotensin–aldosterone system (RAAS) via microvascular ischemia.

Initially, the majority of cases that were described had a traumatic etiology but this has since shifted to iatrogenic causes. Since Page kidney is primarily a unilateral process, symptoms will differ depending on if the patient has native kidneys or not. In patients with only one solitary functioning kidney, the acute hypertension will also be accompanied by an acute decrease in renal function.

In patients with one functioning kidney, prompt diagnosis and surgical treatment are needed to prevent irreversible kidney damage and restoration of kidney function. Medical treatment involves use of an angiotensin-converting enzyme inhibitor (ACEi) or an angiotensin receptor blocker (ARB) to control the hypertension.

== Signs & Symptoms ==
Since Page kidney is a unilateral process, symptom presentation differs significantly depending on if patients have native kidneys or only one functioning kidney, such as renal transplant recipients. In those with a normally functioning second kidney, the only symptom may be new-onset hypertension. However, this is in contrast to patients with just one functioning kidney. These patients will show signs of worsening renal function and decreased urine output in addition to hypertension.

== Causes ==
Causes of Page kidney have appeared to change over time. Initially, the phenomena were most often caused by traumatic injuries, such as contact sports or motor vehicle collisions. More recently, the majority of cases are postprocedural or secondary to mass lesions. Several factors have been implicated as contributory to this change, namely: the more liberal use of high-quality imaging and the increased utilization of invasive procedures. Documented iatrogenic causes include: intra-abdominal surgery, lithotripsy, renal biopsy, and percutaneous endopyelotomy. The biggest shift in cause comes from kidney allograft biopsy, which now accounts for the majority of Page kidney cases.

== Pathophysiology ==
Although to date there have not been any studies specific to Page kidney in humans, two studies in animals and known renal physiology provide a likely mechanism. The elevated blood pressure seen in Page kidney is thought to be caused by the activation of the renin–angiotensin–aldosterone system (RAAS). Compression of the renal parenchyma alters intrarenal blood flow, resulting in a localized decrease in blood flow to the affected nephrons. This decrease in blood flow is recognized by the juxtaglomerular (JG) cells and promotes the cleavage of prorenin into renin.

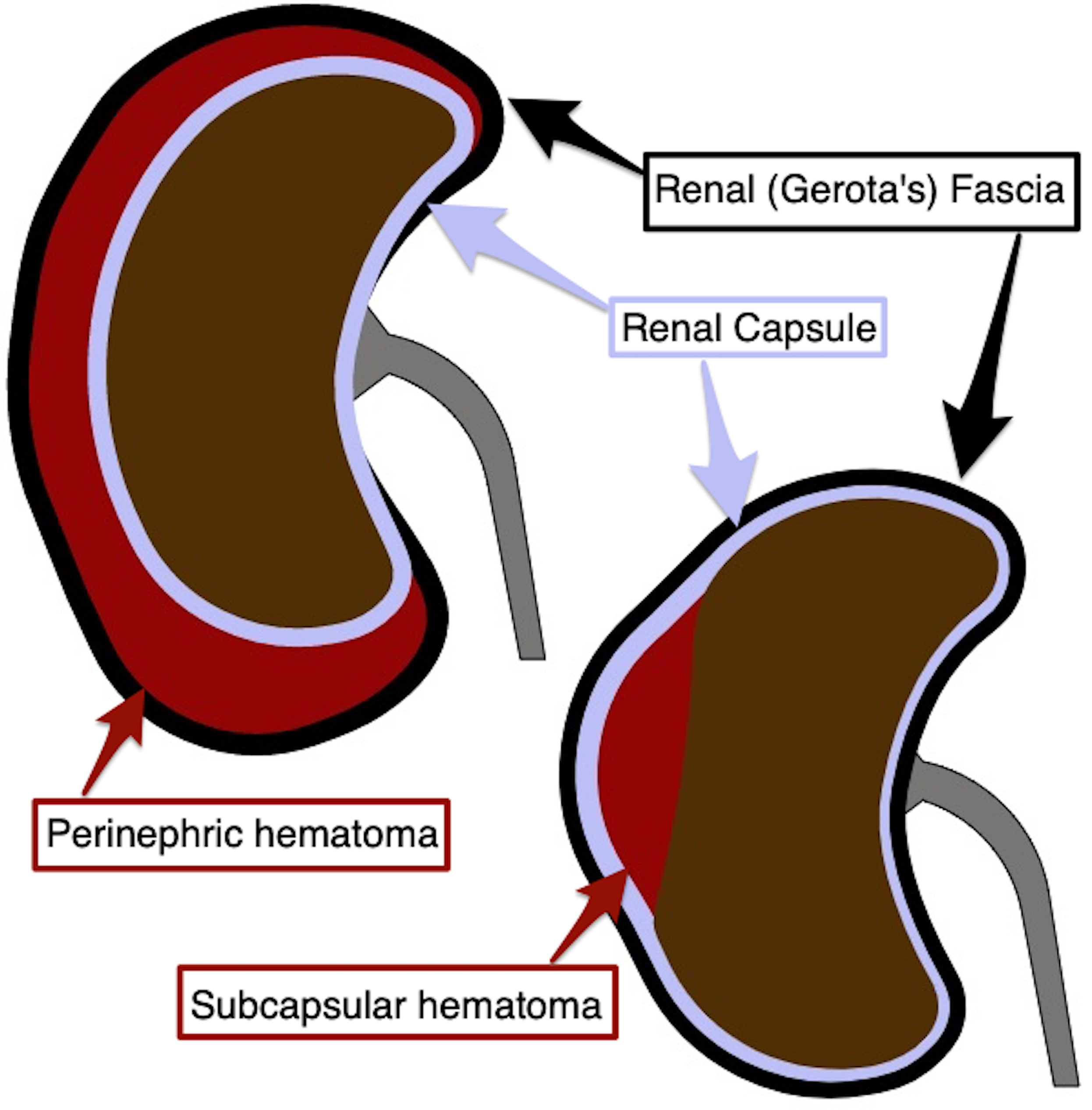
Renal hematoma locations with corresponding renal anatomy.

Each kidney is surrounded by two layers of connective tissue, the inner renal capsule and outer renal (Gerota's) fascia. These layers thus form two potential spaces where fluid can form, the small subcapsular space and the large perinephric space. The renal capsule is fibrous and does not easily expand. Thus, even a small collection of blood in the subcapsular space can cause mass effect on the renal parenchyma.

== Diagnosis ==
Techniques for the diagnosis of Page kidney are all imaging based, including abdominal x-ray, intravenous pyelography, angiography, renal doppler ultrasound, CT scan, and Magnetic resonance imaging (MRI). X-ray and pyelography may add in diagnosis, but are non-diagnostic when used alone. Additionally, pyelograms use potentially nephrotoxic contrast agents, further limiting their utility. Diagnosis is primarily made using ultrasound and CT. CT and MRI imaging can show the space occupying lesions but doppler ultrasound is needed to display the hemodynamic changes occurring in the kidney. Ultrasound is often the initial diagnostic test of choice but due to its low resolution further imaging may be necessary.

== Treatment ==
=== Surgical ===
Surgical treatment of Page kidney has evolved over time as newer techniques have become more popular. Open surgical procedures such as nephrectomy, which was once the treatment of choice have been replaced by less invasive options such as percutaneous drainage or endoscopic capsulotomy.

=== Medical ===
Some cases of Page kidney will resolve spontaneously without need for surgical treatment. In this case, medical treatment focuses on symptomatic treatment of the hypertension with an angiotensin-converting enzyme inhibitor (ACEi) or an angiotensin receptor blocker (ARB). Adding a calcium channel blocker (CCB) or beta blocker to the ACEi or ARB has also been described.

== History ==
Irvine H. Page first demonstrated the Page kidney phenomena experimentally in animals in 1939. He found that wrapping one of the animal's kidneys in cellophane produced hypertension that could be reversed after removal of the kidney. Although he postulated that a similar scenario could be produced clinically in humans due to a hematoma, it was not until 1955 that Page and his colleague William J. Engel published the first case report on Page kidney.
