= Urinothorax =

Presence of urine in the fluid-filled cavity that surrounds the lungs

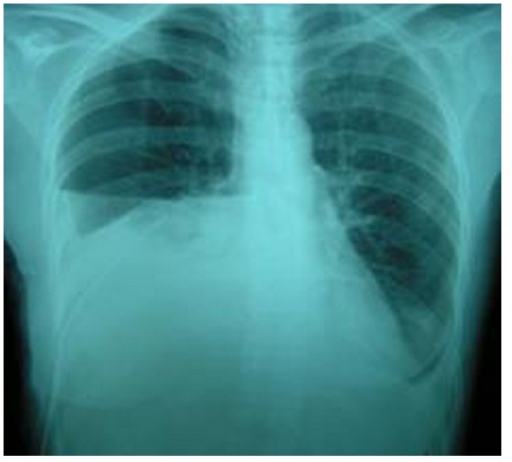
- Right sided pleural effusion caused by urinothorax
- Specialty: Pulmonology
- Symptoms: Similar to pleural effusion
- Usual onset: Hours after triggering condition onset
- Causes: Obstructive uropathy, trauma
- Treatment: Treating the underlying condition
- Prognosis: Good
- Frequency: Extremely rare

Urinothorax (pl. urinothoraces) is defined as urine in the fluid-filled cavity that surrounds the lungs. It is usually caused by obstructive uropathy. It is mainly diagnosed by analyzing the pleural fluid. Treatment involves treating the underlying condition, which typically results in resolution of the urinothorax. It is an extremely rare cause of pleural effusion.

== Signs and symptoms ==
The characteristics of people affected by urinothorax are poorly defined. Urological symptoms tend to occur, while the respiratory symptoms are typically nonexistent or mild. Difficulty breathing, occurring in moderate to large pleural effusions, is the most common respiratory symptom. Other symptoms include fever, abdominal pain, chest pain, and reduced urination. It typically occurs within hours of the causative condition.

== Causes ==
Urinothorax is usually caused by obstructive uropathy. The obstructive uropathy may be at the urinary bladder or urethral level. Obstructive causes have been caused by prostate disease, kidney cyst, retroperitoneal fibrosis, and supernumerary kidney. Traumatic cases tend to occur on one side, while obstructive cases tend to be bilateral. In cases caused by urinoma, the urinothorax is usually on the same side of it. Rarely, it can be on both sides or on the opposite side of the urinoma. It can also be caused by renal biopsy, kidney transplantation, lithotripsy, failed tube nephrostomy, or cancer of the urinary tract.

== Mechanism ==
Injury to the urinary tract can result in collections of fluid known as a urinoma. It has the smell of normal urine. The urine arrives in the pleural space either retroperitoneally (under the peritoneum), or via the retroperitoneal lymphatics. Urine can reach the pleural space either directly or indirectly. It can reach directly, by going through pores in the thoracic diaphragm due to a pressure gradient, or by a rupture of a urinoma releasing the contents into the pleural space. It can also reach indirectly, when a urinoma drains into the pleural space via linkage between the lymphatics of the retroperitoneal and pleural regions.

== Diagnosis ==
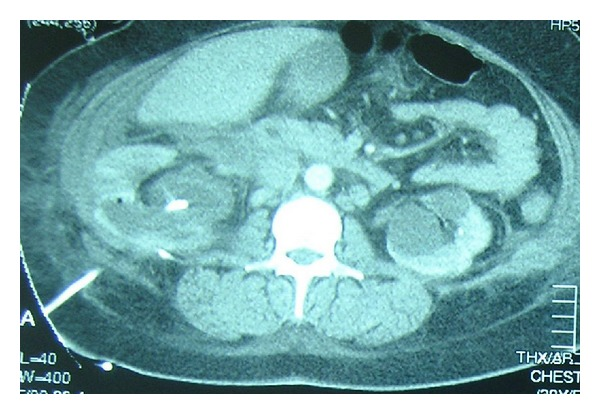
CT scan showing nephrostomy tube, indicated by the white line on the bottom left, in a case of urinothorax being treated

Due to the main symptoms typically being urological rather than respiratory, the condition requires exclusion of other conditions and the identification of specific symptoms before diagnosis. Pleural fluid analysis is one way to diagnose the condition. The pleural fluid is most often straw-colored, and it has a distinct smell like ammonia. The fluid usually has a nucleated cell count between 50 and 1500 per cm^{3}. The pH of the fluid is usually between 5 and 7. Primary factors for diagnosing urinothorax by pleural fluid include low protein and high lactate dehydrogenase content. Low glucose levels and acidity are also described, but are not reliable ways to diagnose or rule out urinothorax. The most important chemical diagnostic factor of the fluid is that the ratio of creatinine to serum is more than 1 and usually more than 10.

Abdominal ultrasonography and CT scan can help diagnose the underlying condition of the genitourinary tract. If other methods prove inconclusive, an accurate diagnosis can be made by a technetium-99m kidney scan, which shows albumin labeled with 99Tc that translocates into the pleural space from the genitourinary tract.

== Treatment ==
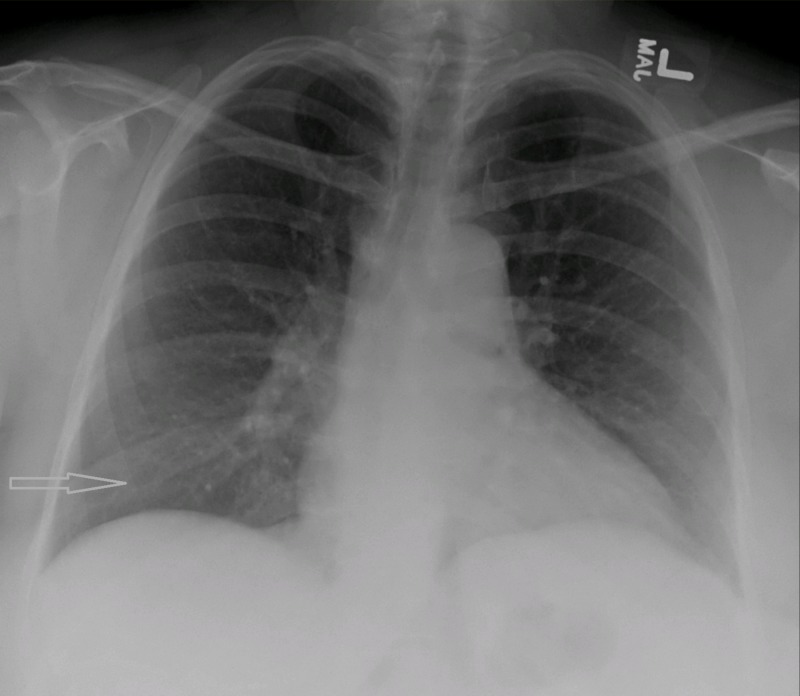
Chest X-ray showing urinothorax disappearing after treatment

Treatment mainly consists of treating the underlying disorder of the genitourinary tract. It requires a multidisciplinary team that includes a pulmonologist and urologist. A nephrostomy tube or Foley catheter can be used to relieve any underlying obstruction. Any injuries are repaired. When the underlying disorder is addressed, the urinothorax rapidly resolves. Thoracic surgery is usually not needed, especially if respiratory symptoms are minimal or nonexistent. Pleurodesis is also ineffective. A chest tube can be used to drain urine from the pleural cavity.

== Prognosis ==
Urinothoraces typically resolve spontaneously without recurring after the underlying urinary tract disorder is treated.

== Epidemiology ==
Urinothorax remains a rare, possibly under-diagnosed, differential in the case of transudative pleural effusion. There were only 58 reported cases up until January 2006. In the literature, there are under 100 reported cases.
