= Subpulmonic effusion =

A subpulmonic effusion is excess fluid that collects at the base of the lung, in the space between the pleura and diaphragm. It is a type of pleural effusion in which the fluid collects in this particular space but can be "layered out" with decubitus chest radiographs. There is minimal nature of costophrenic angle blunting usually found with larger pleural effusions. The occult nature of the effusion can be suspected indirectly on radiograph by elevation of the right diaphragmatic border with a lateral peak and medial flattening. The presence of the gastric bubble on the left with an abnormalagm of more than 2 cm can also suggest the diagnosis. Lateral decubitus views, with the patient lying on their side, can confirm the effusion as it will layer along the lateral chest wall.

Subpulmonic space refers to the space below the lungs in which the subpulmonic fluid fills. Subpulmonic fluid is common particularly in trauma cases where the apparent hemidiaphragm appears defeated and the apex is displaced laterally.
