= Child class =

Child class may refer to:

- Subclass (computer science)
- Child–Pugh score, to assess the prognosis of chronic liver disease
