= Rheumatoid pleuritis =

- Specialty: Rheumatology
- Causes: complication of rheumatoid arthritis

Rheumatoid pleuritis, a form of pleural effusion, is an uncommon complication of rheumatoid arthritis, occurring in 2-3% of patients (Walker and Wright, 1967; Naylor, 1990) Rheumatoid pleura most often appears as an erythematous exanthema, discoloration, or gray discoloration and may grow into a tender, inflamed mass.

Rheumatoid patency is a nonspecific condition characterized by inflammation of the aorta or valve, so as to alter the blood-flow to the aortic valve. Rheumatoid patency typically occurs in older patients, and there is a significant risk for severe, late complications such as aortic valve stenosis, heart valve stenosis.

== Presentation ==
Pleural effusion usually occurs in patients previously diagnosed with rheumatoid arthritis, but it can also occur concurrently with or before the development of the joint manifestations of the disease (Graham, 1990; Chou and Chang, 2002). Patients may present with the signs of pleural effusion: dullness on percussion, diminished or absent breath sounds and vocal fremitus, and egophony at the level of the pleural liquid.

== Histopathology ==
Light microscopy reveals replacement of normal cells lining the pleura (mesothelial cells) by a layer of pseudostratified epithelioid cells, multinucleated giant macrophages, and necrotic material (Mandl et al., 1969; Lillington et al. 1971)

== Diagnosis ==
Diagnosis relies on the characteristic cytopathology of the exudative pleural fluid, which contains elongated and giant multinucleated macrophages in a sea of amorphous granular material. The absence of mesothelial cells is also characteristic (Champion, 1968). While these findings are highly specific for rheumatoid pleuritis (Nosanchuk et al., 1968; Geisinger, 1985; Engel, 1986; Montes, 1988; Shinto, 1988), rheumatoid pleuritis must be considered if more than one of the above cytologic findings are detected.

== Treatment ==
Steroids are the mainstay of treatment for rheumatoid arthritis, and have been shown to improve rheumatoid pleuritis.
