= Cardiophrenic angle =

Angle between the heart and diaphragm

The cardiophrenic angle is the angle between the heart and the diaphragm, as seen on imaging (most commonly X-ray). There are two cardiophrenic angles, however the one on the right is obscured by the cardiohepatic angle (the angle between the heart and liver).

== See also ==
- Costodiaphragmatic recess (Costophrenic angle)
- Costomediastinal recess
