= Costodiaphragmatic recess =

Space around the human lung

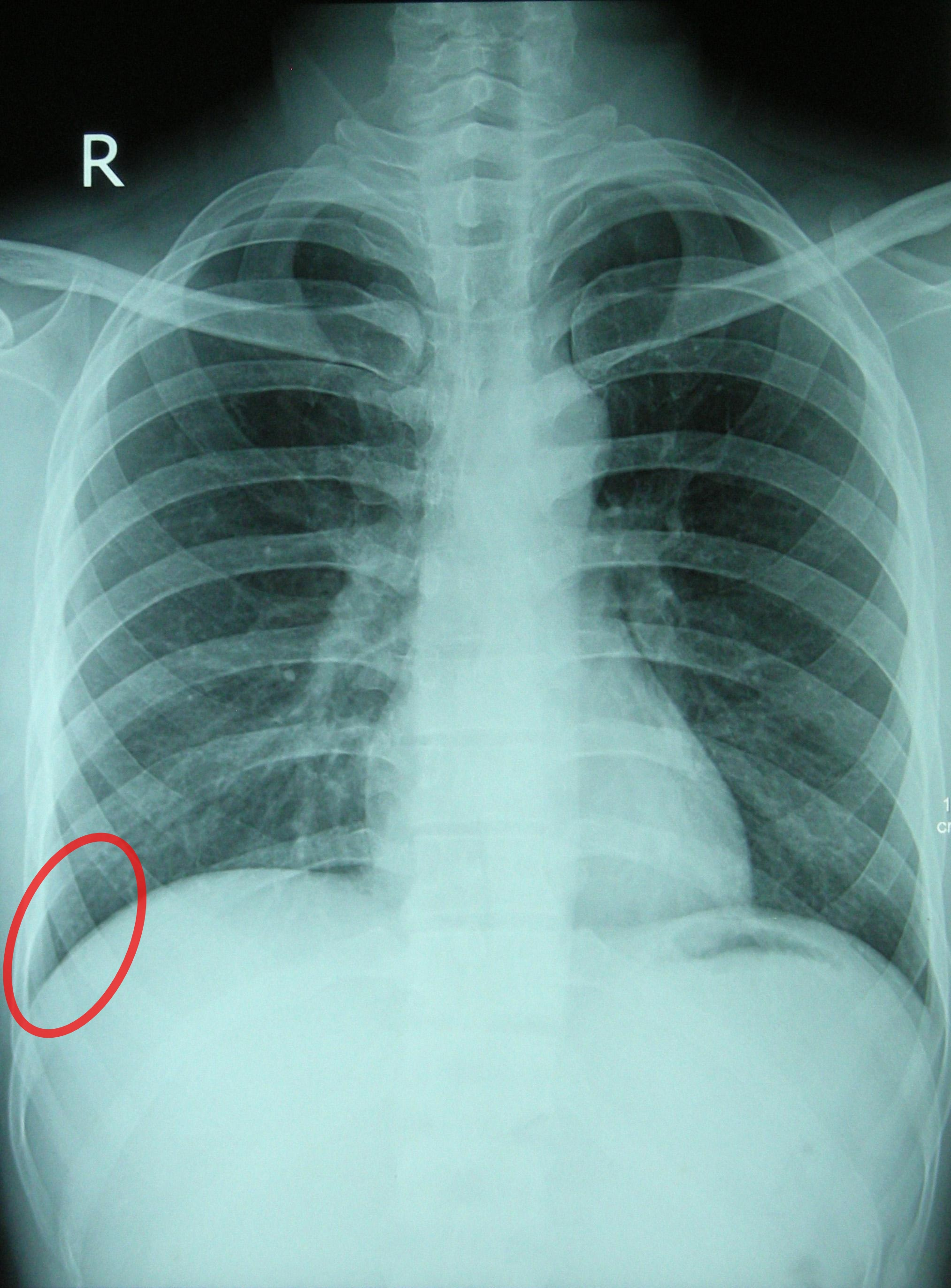
- Chest X-ray of a 30-year-old healthy man, with the costodiaphragmatic recess label in red ellipse

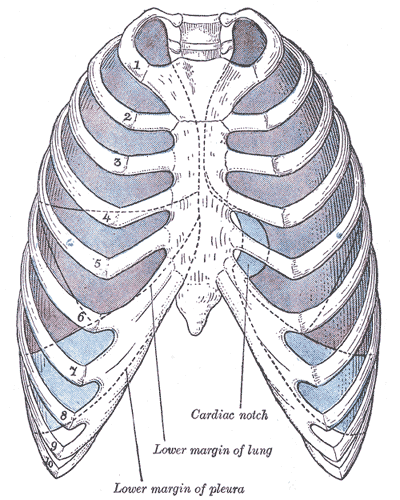
- Front view of thorax, showing the relations of the pleurae and lungs to the chest wall (pleura in blue and lungs in purple)

Details

Identifiers
- Latin: recessus costodiaphragmaticus
- TA98: A07.1.02.013
- TA2: 3318
- FMA: 11355

The costodiaphragmatic recess, also called the costophrenic recess or phrenicocostal sinus, is the posterolateral fringe of the pleural space, a potential space around the lung inside the pleural cavity. It is located at the acutely angled junction ("reflection") between the costal and diaphragmatic parietal pleurae, and is interpreted two-dimensionally on plain X-rays as the costophrenic angle. It measures approximately 5 cm (2.0 in) vertically and extends from the eighth to the tenth rib along the mid-axillary line.

== Function ==
The lungs expand into this recess during forced inspiration; however, the recess never gets filled completely. During expiration, it contains nothing apart from gravitated serous fluid.

== Clinical significance ==
Pleural effusions collect in the costodiaphragmatic recess when in standing position, and present on plain X-rays as "blunting" of the costophrenic angle.

A thoracocentesis (pleural tap) is often performed here while a patient is in full expiration because of less risk of puncturing the lungs and thereby causing pneumothorax.

=== Imaging ===
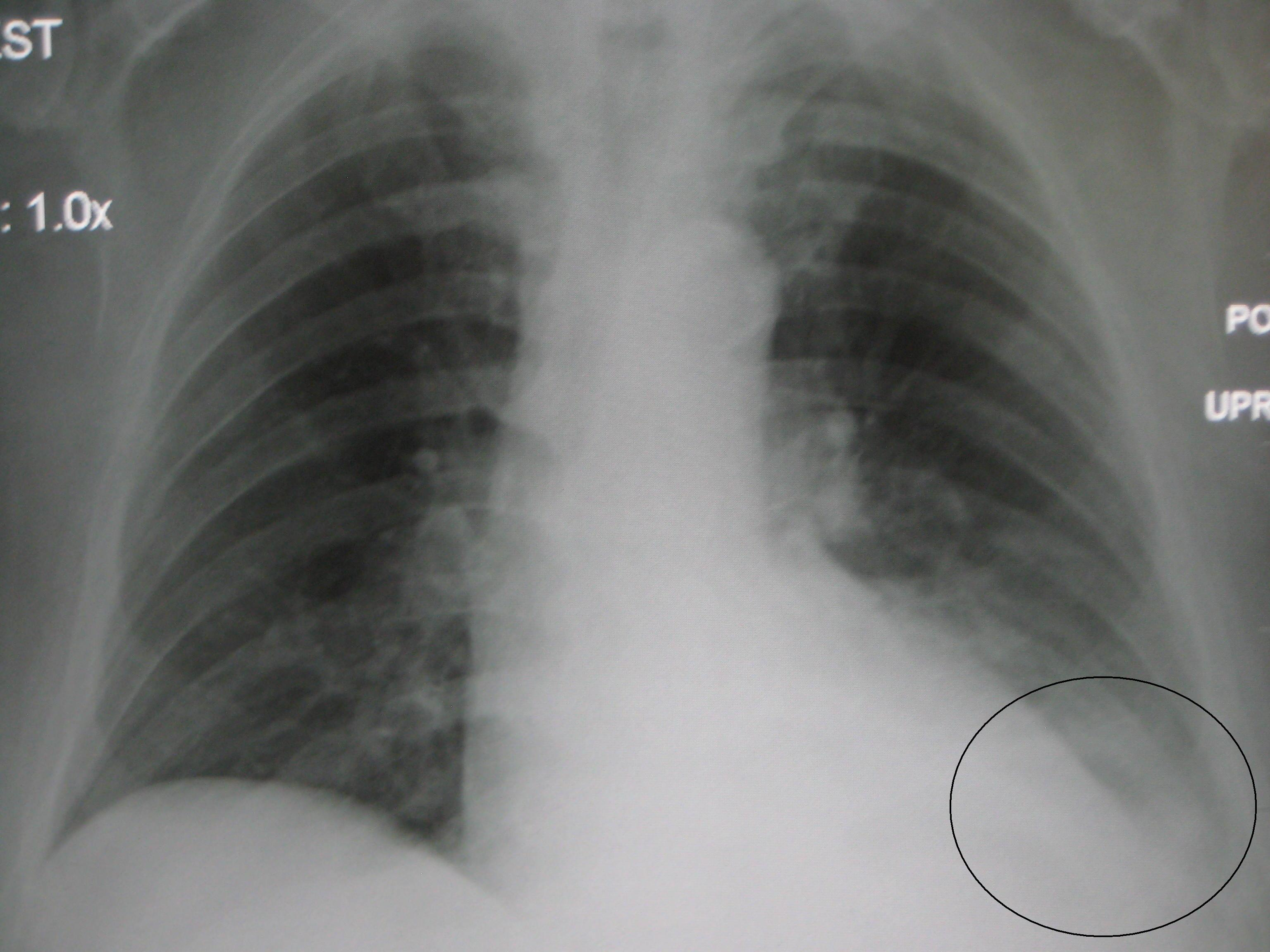
Comparison between a normal costophrenic angle on the patient's right, and an obscured costophrenic angle (circled) on the patient's left, due to pneumonia with parapneumonic effusion.

In anatomy, the costophrenic angles are the places where the diaphragm (-phrenic) meets the ribs (costo-).

Each costophrenic angle can normally be seen as on chest x-ray as a sharply-pointed, downward indentation (dark) between each hemi-diaphragm (white) and the adjacent chest wall (white). A small portion of each lung normally reaches into the costophrenic angle. The normal angle usually measures thirty degrees.

=== Pleural effusion ===
With pleural effusion, fluid often builds up in the costophrenic angle (due to gravity). This can push the lung upwards, resulting in "blunting" of the costophrenic angle. The posterior angle is the deepest. Obtuse angulation is sign of disease.

Chest x-ray is the first test done to confirm an excess of pleural fluid. The lateral upright chest x-ray should be examined when a pleural effusion is suspected. In an upright x-ray, 75 mL of fluid blunts the posterior costophrenic angle. Blunting of the lateral costophrenic angle usually requires about 175 mL but may take as much as 500 mL. Larger pleural effusions opacify portions of the hemithorax and may cause mediastinal shift; effusions > 4 L may cause complete opacification of the hemithorax and mediastinal shift to the contralateral side.

== See also ==
- Thoracentesis
- Costomediastinal recess
- Cardiophrenic angle
