= Costomediastinal recess =

Space of the thorax

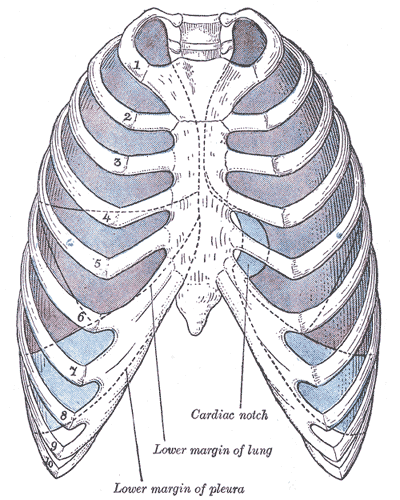
- Front view of thorax, showing the relations of the pleuræ and lungs to the chest wall. Pleura in blue; lungs in purple.

Details

Identifiers
- Latin: recessus costomediastinalis pleuralis
- TA98: A07.1.02.014
- TA2: 3319
- FMA: 9747

The costomediastinal recess is a potential space at the border of the mediastinal pleura and the costal pleura. It assists lung expansion during deep inspiration, although its role is not as significant as the costodiaphragmatic recess, which has a greater volume. The lung expands into the costomediastinal recess even during shallow inspiration. The costomediastinal recess is most obvious in the cardiac notch of the left lung.

== See also ==
- Costodiaphragmatic recess (Costophrenic angle)
- Cardiophrenic angle
- Mediastinum
