= Malignant pleural effusion =

- Specialty: Oncology

Malignant pleural effusion is a condition in which cancer causes an abnormal amount of fluid to collect between the thin layers of tissue (pleura) lining the outside of the lung and the wall of the chest cavity. Lung cancer and breast cancer account for about 50-65% of malignant pleural effusions. Other common causes include pleural mesothelioma and lymphoma.

== Diagnosis ==
=== Clinical evaluation ===
Clinical factors predicting the diagnosis of malignant pleural effusions are symptoms lasting more than 1 month and the absence of fever.

=== Imaging ===
Imaging is needed to confirm the presence of a pleural effusion. A Chest radiograph is usually performed first and may demonstrate an underlying lung cancer as well as the pleural effusion. Ultrasound has a sensitivity of 73% and specificity of 100% at distinguishing malignant pleural effusions from other causes of pleural effusion, based on the presence of visible pleural metastases, pleural thickening greater than 1 cm, pleural nodularity, diaphragmatic thickening measuring greater than 7mm and an echogenic swirling pattern visible in the pleural fluid.

=== Biochemical analysis ===
Malignant pleural effusions are exudates. A low pleural fluid pH is associated with poorer survival and reduced pleurodesis efficacy.

=== Histopathology ===
Pleural fluid cytology is positive in 60% of cases. However, in the remaining cases, pleural biopsy is required. Image guided biopsy and thoracoscopy have largely replaced blind biopsy due to their greater sensitivity and safety profile. CT guided biopsy has a sensitivity of 87% compared to Abrams' needle biopsy, which has a sensitivity of 47%.

=== Biomarkers ===
Identification of pleural fluid biomarkers to distinguish malignant pleural effusions from other causes of exudative effusions would help diagnosis. Biomarkers that have been shown to be raised in malignant pleural effusions compared to benign disease include vascular endothelial growth factor (VEGF), endostatin, matrix metalloproteinases and tumour markers such as carcinoembryonic antigen. Pleural fluid mesothelin has a sensitivity of 71%, greater than that of cytology, and a specificity of 89% for the diagnosis of malignant mesothelioma.

== Treatment ==
The goal of treatment of malignant pleural effusions is relief of shortness of breath. Occasionally, treatment of the underlying cancer can cause resolution of the effusion. This may be the case with types of cancer that respond well to chemotherapy, such as small cell carcinoma or lymphoma. Simple aspiration of pleural fluid can relieve shortness of breath rapidly but fluid and symptoms will usually recur within a couple of weeks. Drainage should generally be done under ultrasound guidance.

For this reason, more permanent treatments are usually used to prevent fluid recurrence. Standard treatment involves inserting an indwelling pleural catheter and pleurodesis. However, this treatment requires an inpatient stay of approximately 2–7 days, can be painful and has a significant failure rate. This has led to the development of tunneled pleural catheters (e.g., Pleurx Catheters), which allow outpatient treatment of effusions. If an infection due to the catheter occurs, antibiotics are given and the catheter is generally left in.

A Cochrane review concluded tentatively in favour of thoracoscopy to remove the fluid and blow talc into the pleural cavity (talc poudrage) compared to other commonly used methods.
