= Palmar erythema =

Reddening of the palms

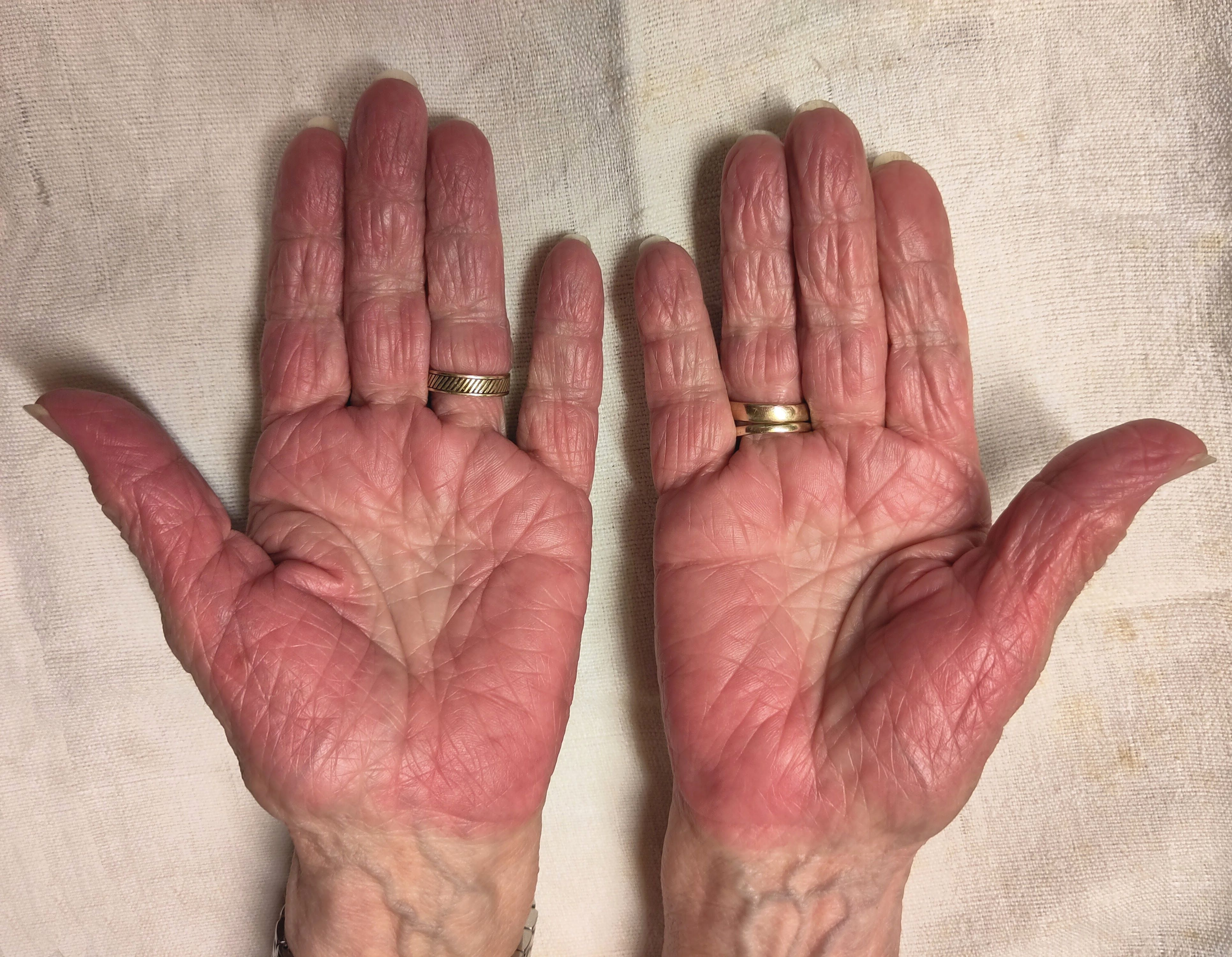
- Specialty: Dermatology

Palmar erythema is reddening of the palms at the thenar and hypothenar eminences.

== Causes ==
It is associated with various physiological as well as pathological changes, or may be a normal finding:

- Portal hypertension
- Chronic liver disease (including chronic hepatitis)
- Pregnancy
- Polycythemia
- Thyrotoxicosis
- Rheumatoid arthritis (especially in patients with polycythaemia)
- Eczema and psoriasis
- Deep telangiectasias
- Coxsackievirus A infection (Hand, foot and mouth disease)
- Rocky Mountain spotted fever
- Secondary syphilis
- Kawasaki disease
- Adverse drug reaction: palmoplantar erythrodysesthesia (acral erythema)

Because circulating levels of estrogen increase in both cirrhosis and pregnancy, estrogen was thought to be the main cause for the increased vascularity. More recently, nitric oxide has also been implicated in the pathogenesis of palmar erythema.

== Treatment ==
Palmar erythema has no specific treatment. Management is based on the underlying cause. When its cause is treated then patients get relief. If it is attributable to a particular drug then the drug should be withdrawn.

== See also ==
- Toxic erythema
- List of cutaneous conditions
