= Milan criteria =

Set of criteria for liver transplantation

In transplantation medicine, the Milan criteria are set of criteria applied in consideration of patients with cirrhosis and hepatocellular carcinoma (HCC) for liver transplantation with intent to cure their disease. Their significance derives from a landmark 1996 study in 48 patients by Mazzaferro et al which showed that selecting cases for transplantation according to specific strict criteria led to improved overall and disease-free survival at a four-year time point. These same criteria have since been adopted by the Organ Procurement and Transplantation Network (OPTN) in the evaluation of patients for potential transplantation.The threshold Milan criteria are as follows:

- one lesion smaller than 5 cm; alternatively, up to three lesions, each smaller than 3 cm
- no extrahepatic manifestations
- no evidence of gross vascular invasion

Under current OPTN/ONUS guidelines, patients with cirrhosis and HCC who meet these criteria may be considered for transplantation. Depending on the treatment algorithm, additional factors such as advanced liver disease (as classified by Child-Pugh score) or evidence of portal hypertension may also affect suitability for transplantation.

== Controversy and research ==
Given the limitations of the original Mazzaferro study, including the small number of patients and limited inclusion criteria, there is ongoing discussion and controversy regarding the appropriate criteria for transplant. Additional studies attempting to replicate outcomes of the Mazzaferro study using Milan criteria thresholds have reported slightly less favorable five-year survival statistics, ranging from 50% to 70%.

Some have advocated for the use of expanded guidelines for liver transplantation in the setting of HCC. In 2003, Yao et al. reported experience at the University of California San Francisco five-year post-transplantation survival of 75% in patients with tumors as large as 6.5 cm, or up to three lesions each less than 4.5 cm with cumulative tumor burden ≤8 cm. Additional studies using these so-called "UCSF criteria" have shown favorable post transplant outcomes, although also higher rates of post transplant recurrence and higher rates of disease progression while waiting for transplant.

== See also ==
- Child-Pugh score
- Model for End-Stage Liver Disease
