= Lymphocele =

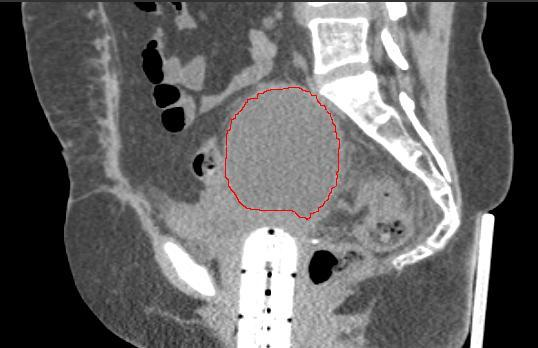
- A CT scan of post-operative lymphocele
- Specialty: Surgery

A lymphocele is a collection of lymphatic fluid within the body not bordered by epithelial lining. It is usually a surgical complication seen after extensive pelvic surgery (such as cancer surgery) and is most commonly found in the retroperitoneal space. Spontaneous development is rare.

== Signs and symptoms ==
Many lymphoceles are asymptomatic. Larger lymphoceles may cause symptoms related to compression of adjacent structures leading to lower abdominal pain, abdominal fullness, constipation, urinary frequency, and edema of the genitals and/or legs. Serious sequelae could develop and include infection of the lymphocele, obstruction and infection of the urinary tract, intestinal obstruction, venous thrombosis, pulmonary embolism, chylous ascites and lymphatic fistula formation. On clinical examination the skin may be reddened and swollen and a mass felt. Ultrasonography or CT scan will help to establish a diagnosis. Other fluid collections to be considered in the differential diagnosis are urinoma, seroma, hematoma, as well as collections of pus. Also, when lower limb edema is present, venous thrombosis needs to be considered.

== Cause ==
The risk of the development of a lymphocele is positively correlated to the extent of the removal of lymphatic tissue during surgery (lymphadenectomy). Surgery destroys and disrupts the normal channels of lymph flow. If the injury is minor, collateral channels will transport lymph fluid, but with extensive damage, fluid may accumulate in an anatomic space resulting in a lymphocele. Typical operations leading to lymphocysts are renal transplantation and radical pelvic surgery with lymph node removal because of bladder, prostatic or gynecologic cancer. Other factors that may predispose of lymphocele development are preoperative radiation therapy, heparin prophylaxis (used to prevent deep vein thrombosis), and tumor characteristics. After radical surgery for cervical and ovarian cancer studies with follow-up CT found lymphoceles in 20% and 32%, respectively. Typically they develop within 4 months after surgery.

== Management ==
It has been suggested that suction drains placed during surgery and non-peritonisation (not closing the posterior peritoneum) may reduce the possibility of lymphocele development. Smaller lymphoceles can be managed expectantly, and many lesions will regress over time. For symptomatic lesions a number of approaches are available and include fine needle aspiration with ultrasound or computed tomography guidance, catheter insertion and drainage (with possible use of sclerosants), and surgical drainage. Sex and masturbation may cause the lymphocele to grow if it is in the genital area. It is suggested to avoid these activities for around four to six weeks. Some exercises may also help to shrink it.
