= Parapneumonic effusion =

Accumulation of fluid in the pleural space due to another illness

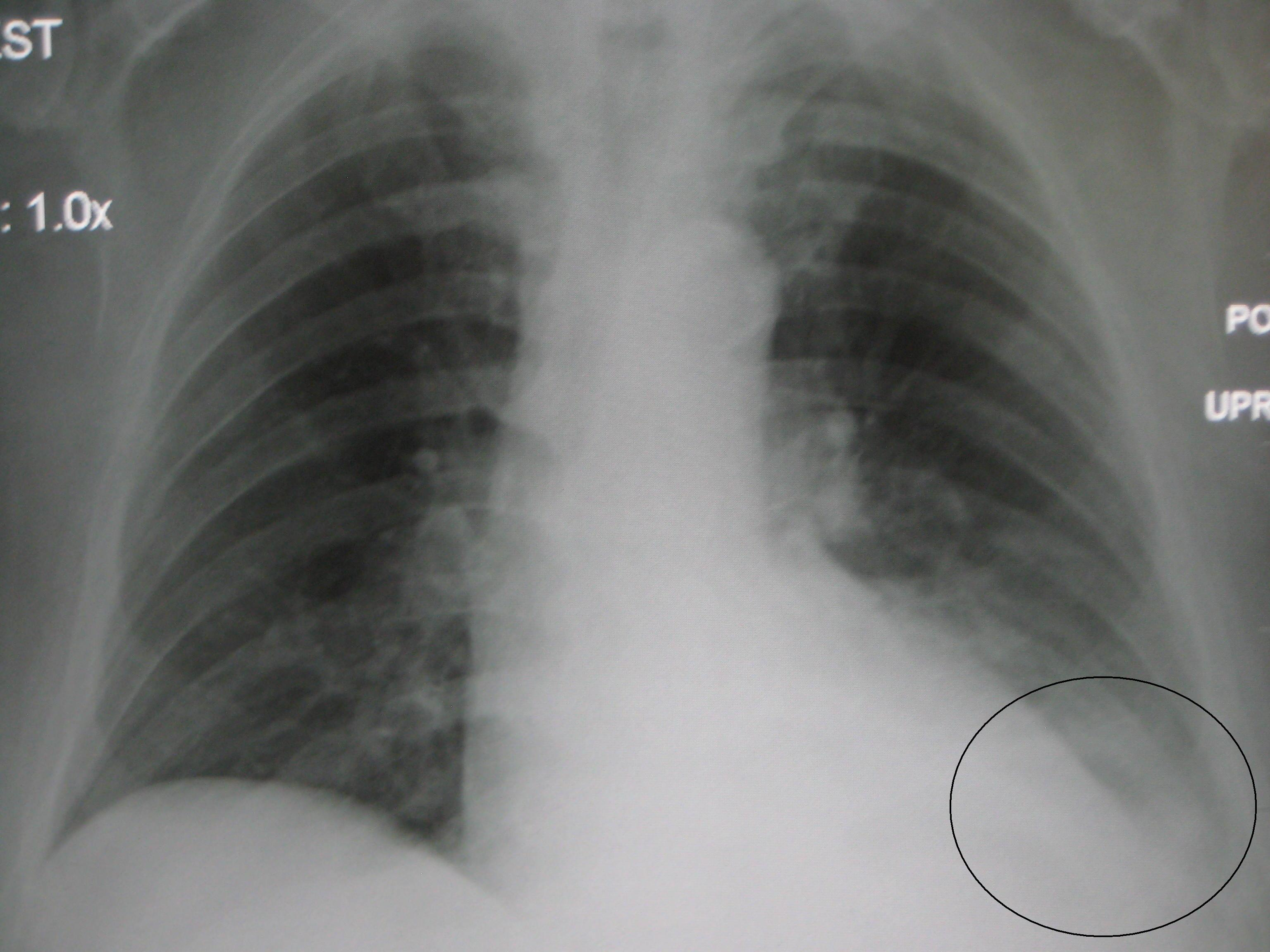
- A parapneumonic effusion (circled), due to a left lower lobe pneumonia

A parapneumonic effusion is a type of pleural effusion (accumulation of fluid in the pleural cavity) that arises as a result of a pneumonia, lung abscess, or bronchiectasis. There are three types of parapneumonic effusions: uncomplicated effusions, complicated effusions, and empyema. Uncomplicated effusions generally respond well to appropriate antibiotic treatment.

== Diagnosis ==
The criteria for a complicated parapneumonic effusion include Gram stain–positive or culture-positive pleural fluid, pleural fluid pH <7.20, and pleural fluid LDH that is greater than three times the upper limit of normal of serum LDH. Additionally, the pleural fluid in a patient with parapneumonic effusion contains mostly neutrophils, and a predominance of other cell types may indicate the requirement of a different diagnosis. Diagnostic techniques available include plain film chest x-ray, computed tomography (CT), and ultrasound. Ultrasound can be useful in differentiating between empyema and other transudative and exudative effusions due in part to relative echogenicity of different organs such as the liver (often isoechogenic with empyema).

== Treatment ==
Appropriate management includes chest tube drainage (tube thoracostomy). Treatment of empyemas includes antibiotics, complete pleural fluid drainage, and reexpansion of the lung. Other treatments include the use of decortication.
