= European Journal of Gastroenterology & Hepatology =

- Discipline: Gastroenterology, hepatology
- Language: English
- Edited by: J.P.H. Drenth, Didier Lebrec

Publication details
- History: 1989–present
- Publisher: Lippincott Williams & Wilkins
- Frequency: Monthly
- Impact factor: 2.251 (2020)

Standard abbreviations
- ISO 4: Eur. J. Gastroenterol. Hepatol.

Indexing
- CODEN: EJGHES
- ISSN: 0954-691X (print); 1473-5687 (web)
- LCCN: 90031034
- OCLC no.: 883278704

Links
- Journal homepage; Online access; Online archive

The European Journal of Gastroenterology & Hepatology is a peer-reviewed medical journal covering the fields of gastroenterology and hepatology. It was established in 1989 and is published by Lippincott Williams & Wilkins. The editors-in-chief are Joost PH Drenth (Radboud University Medical Center) and Didier Lebrec. According to the Journal Citation Reports, the journal has a 2020 impact factor of 2.251.
