= Extravasation of urine =

Leakage of urine into other bodily cavities due to urethral blockage

- Specialty: Urology

Extravasation of urine refers to the condition where an interruption of the urethra leads to a collection of urine in other cavities (extravasation), such as the scrotum or the penis in males. It is sometimes associated with a calculus.

== Mechanism ==
An injury to the urethra leaving Buck's fascia intact results in a collection of urine (extravasation) limited to the penis, deep to Buck's fascia. If the injury to the bulb of the penis results in urethral injury accompanying a tear of Buck's fascia, then extravasated blood and urine accumulates in the superficial perineal space, passing into the penis (outer to Buck's fascia) as well as the scrotum and lower anterior abdominal wall. Extravasation of urine involving a compromised Buck's fascia can be observed clinically, with blood collecting in the inguinal superficial pouch, resulting in a butterfly-shaped region surrounding the penis.

== Urinoma ==
Long term complications of renal trauma, ureteral obstruction, or kidney transplant can lead to the formation of an urinoma encapsulating extravasated urine.
