= Chronic liver disease =

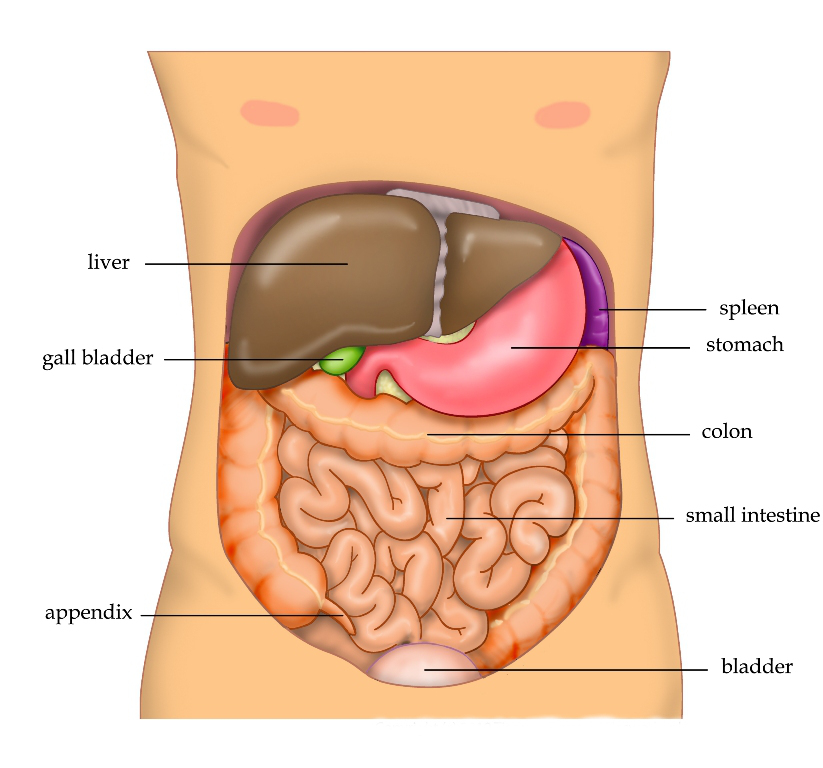
- The human liver is located in the upper right abdomen
- Specialty: Gastroenterology

Chronic liver disease in the clinical context is a disease process of the liver that involves a process of progressive destruction and regeneration of the liver parenchyma leading to fibrosis and cirrhosis. "Chronic liver disease" refers to disease of the liver which lasts over a period of six months. It consists of a wide range of liver pathologies which include inflammation (chronic hepatitis), liver cirrhosis, and hepatocellular carcinoma. The entire spectrum need not be experienced.

== Signs and symptoms ==
Signs of chronic liver disease detectable on clinical examination can be divided into those that are associated with the diagnosis of chronic liver disease, associated with decompensation, and associated with the cause.

=== Chronic liver disease ===
- Nail clubbing
- Palmar erythema
- Spider nevi (angiomata)
- Gynaecomastia
- Feminising hair distribution
- Testicular atrophy
- Small irregular shrunken liver
- Anaemia
- Caput medusae

=== Decompensation ===
- Drowsiness (encephalopathy)
- Hyperventilation (encephalopathy)
- Metabolic flap/asterixis (encephalopathy)
- Jaundice (excretory dysfunction)
- Ascites (portal hypertension and hypoalbuminemia)
- Leukonychia (hypoalbuminaemia)
- Peripheral oedema (hypoalbuminaemia)
- Bruising (coagulopathy)
- Acid-base imbalance, most commonly respiratory alkalosis

=== Signs associated with the cause ===
- Dupuytren's contracture (alcohol)
- Parotid enlargement (alcohol)
- Peripheral neuropathy (alcohol and some drugs)
- Cerebellar signs (alcohol and Wilson's disease)
- Liver enlargement (alcohol, NAFLD, haemochromatosis)
- Kayser-Fleisher rings (Wilson's disease)
- Increased pigmentation of the skin (haemochromatosis)
- Signs of right heart failure

Note that other diseases can involve the liver and cause hepatomegaly but would not be considered part of the spectrum of chronic liver disease. Some examples of this would include chronic cancers with liver metastases, infiltrative haematological disorders such as chronic lymphoproliferative conditions, chronic myeloid leukaemias, myelofibrosis and metabolic abnormalities such as Gaucher's disease and glycogen storage diseases.

=== Complications ===
- Portal hypertension
  - Ascites
  - Hypersplenism (with or without splenomegaly)
  - Lower oesophageal varices and rectal varices
- Synthetic dysfunction
  - Hypoalbuminaemia
  - Coagulopathy
- Hepatopulmonary syndrome
- Hepatorenal syndrome
- Encephalopathy
- Hepatocellular carcinoma

== Causes ==
The list of conditions associated with chronic liver disease is extensive and can be categorised in the following way:

Viral causes

- Hepatitis B
- Hepatitis C

Cytomegalovirus (CMV), Epstein Barr virus (EBV), and yellow fever viruses cause acute hepatitis.

Toxic and drugs

- Alcoholic liver disease
- Rarely drug induced liver disease from methotrexate, amiodarone, nitrofurantoin and others

Paracetamol (acetaminophen) causes acute liver damage.

Metabolic

- Non-alcoholic fatty liver disease
- Haemochromatosis, iron overload
- Wilson's disease, (excess copper due to a genetic fault)

Autoimmune response causes

- Primary biliary cholangitis (previously known as primary biliary cirrhosis)
- Primary sclerosing cholangitis
- Autoimmune Hepatitis

Other

- Right heart failure

== Risk factors ==
These differ according to the type of chronic liver disease.

- Excessive alcohol use
- Obesity
- Metabolic syndrome including raised blood lipids
- Health care professionals who are exposed to body fluids and infected blood
- Sharing infected needle and syringes
- Having unprotected sex and multiple sex partners
- Working with toxic chemicals without wearing safety clothes
- Certain prescription medications

== Diagnosis ==
Chronic liver disease takes several years to develop and the condition may not be recognised unless there is clinical awareness of subtle signs and investigation of abnormal liver function tests.

Testing for chronic liver disease involves blood tests, imaging including ultrasound, and a biopsy of the liver. The liver biopsy is a simple procedure done with a fine thin needle under local anaesthesia. The tissue sample is sent to a laboratory where it is examined underneath a microscope.

== Treatment ==
The treatment of chronic liver disease depends on the cause. Specific conditions may be treated with medications including corticosteroids, interferon, antivirals, bile acids or other drugs. Supportive therapy for complications of cirrhosis include diuretics, albumin, vitamin K, blood products, antibiotics and nutritional therapy. Other patients may require surgery or a transplant. Transplant is required when the liver fails and there is no other alternative.

=== Alternative medicine ===
Some studies indicate herbal remedies are useful, but there is not conclusive evidence to support their use. Some support may be found in the orthodox medical use of two of these in acute liver failure: N-acetyl cysteine (NAC) is the treatment of choice for acetaminophen overdose; both NAC and milk-thistle (Silybum marianum) or its derivative silibinin are used in liver poisoning from certain mushrooms, notably Amanita phalloides, although the use of milk-thistle is controversial. Some common herbs are known or suspected to be harmful to the liver, including black cohosh, ma huang, chaparral, comfrey, germander, greater celandine, kava, mistletoe, pennyroyal, skull cap and valerian.

== See also ==
- MELD-Plus, a rating system used to assess the severity of chronic liver disease
