= Lactate dehydrogenase =

Class of enzymes

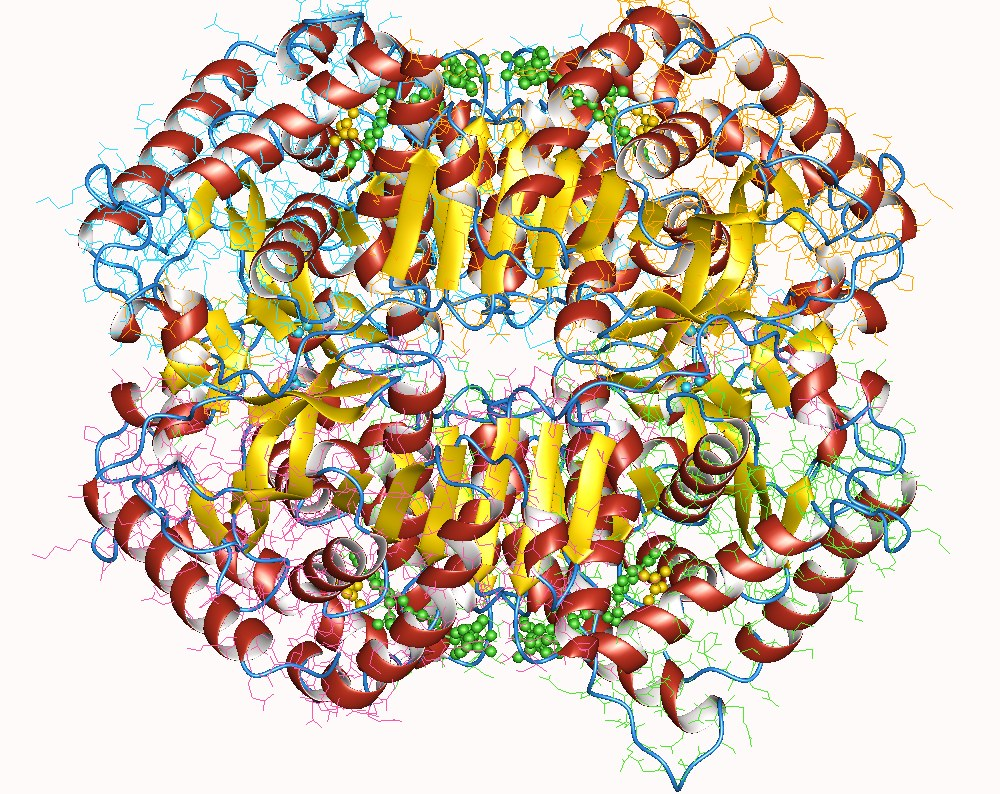
- Lactate dehydrogenase M tetramer (LDH5), Human

Identifiers
- EC no.: 1.1.1.27
- CAS no.: 9001-60-9

Databases
- BRENDA: enzyme data
- ExPASy: NiceZyme view
- KEGG: enzyme entry
- MetaCyc: metabolic pathway
- Rhea: reactions
- PDB structures: RCSB PDB PDBe PDBsum
- Gene Ontology: AmiGO / QuickGO
Search
- PMC: articles
- PubMed: articles
- NCBI: proteins

Lactate dehydrogenase (LDH or LD) is a type of enzyme found in nearly all living cells which catalyzes the conversion of pyruvate to lactate and back (as it converts the cofactor NAD^{+} to NADH and back).

LDH exists in four distinct enzyme classes. This article is specifically about the NAD(P)-dependent L-lactate dehydrogenase (EC 1.1.1.27), which is the type that has been found in humans. The other types act on the right-handed version of lactate (D-lactate dehydrogenase), or use different cofactors (L-lactate dehydrogenase (cytochrome) and D-lactate dehydrogenase (cytochrome)).

LDH is expressed extensively in body tissues, such as blood cells and heart muscle. Because it is released during tissue damage, it is a marker of common injuries and disease such as heart failure.

== Reaction ==
Lactate dehydrogenase catalyzes the interconversion of pyruvate and lactate with concomitant interconversion of the cofactors NADH and NAD^{+}. It converts pyruvate, the final product of glycolysis, to lactate when oxygen is absent or in short supply, and it performs the reverse reaction during the Cori cycle in the liver. At high concentrations of lactate, the enzyme exhibits feedback inhibition, and the rate of conversion of pyruvate to lactate is decreased. It also catalyzes the dehydrogenation of 2-hydroxybutyrate, but this is a much poorer substrate than lactate.

pyruvic acid
+ NADH
H^{+}
H^{+}
lactic acid
+ NAD^{+}

== Active site ==
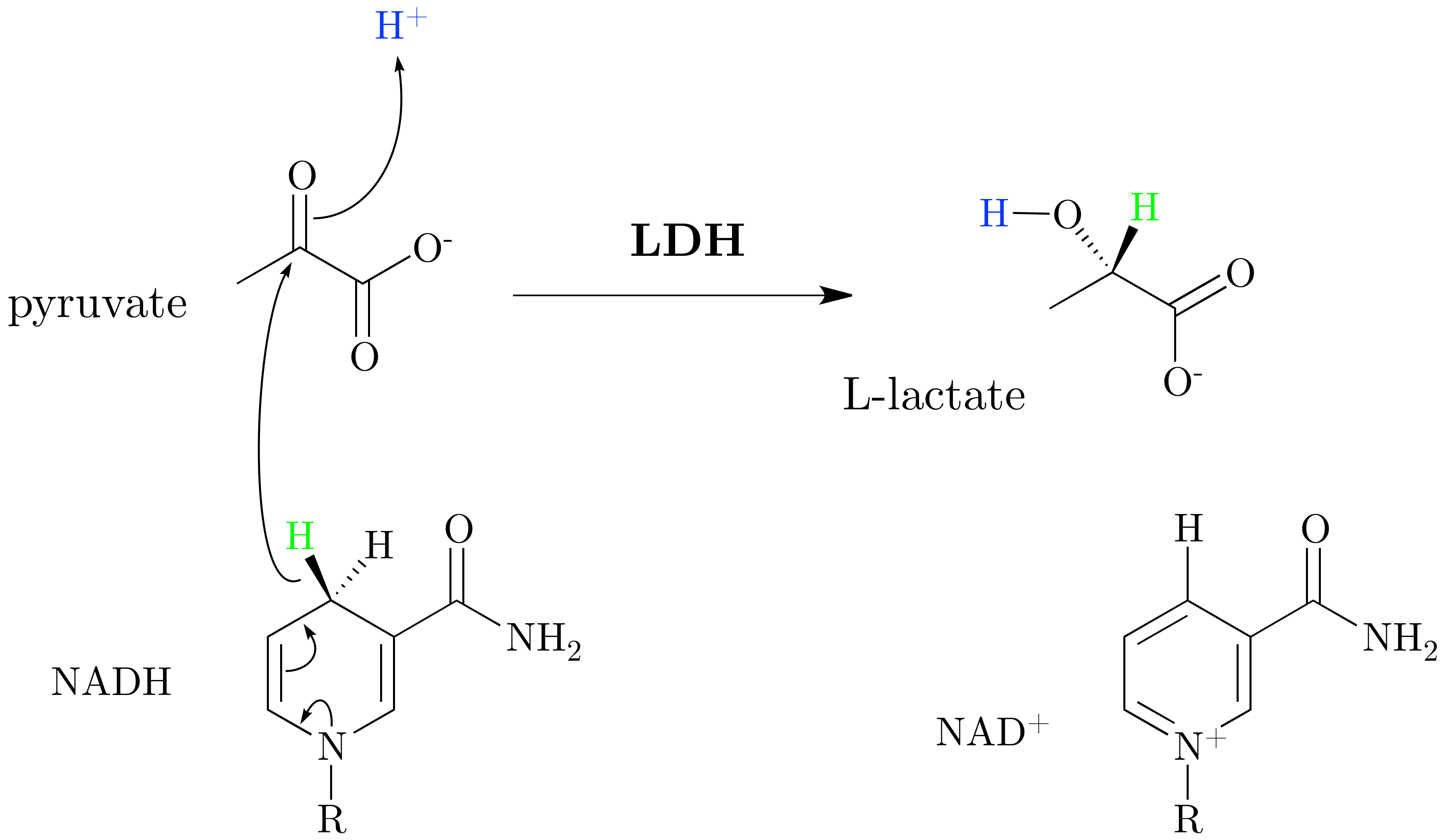
Arrow pushing mechanism for the reaction catalyzed by lactate dehydrogenase

LDH in humans uses His(193) as the proton acceptor, and works in unison with the coenzyme (Arg99 and Asn138), and substrate (Arg106; Arg169; Thr248) binding residues. The His(193) active site, is not only found in the human form of LDH, but is found in many different animals, showing the convergent evolution of LDH. The two different subunits of LDH (LDHA, also known as the M subunit of LDH, and LDHB, also known as the H subunit of LDH) both retain the same active site and the same amino acids participating in the reaction. The noticeable difference between the two subunits that make up LDH's tertiary structure is the replacement of alanine (in the M chain) with a glutamine (in the H chain). This tiny but notable change is believed to be the reason the H subunit can bind NAD faster, and the M subunit's catalytic activity isn't reduced in the presence of acetylpyridine adenine dinucleotide, whereas the H subunit's activity is reduced fivefold.

== Isozymes ==
Humans produce 5 protein chains that may act as L-lactate dehydrogenases: LDH-A, LDH-B, LDH-C, LDHAL6A and LDHAL6B, along with the mitochondrial protein LDHD that acts as a D-lactate dehydrogenase. Four copies of the same chain combine to form a homotetramer that act as active enzymes (and some may also form heterotetramers).

The two most common subunits are the LDH-A and LDH-B peptides (originally named LDH-M and LDH-H respectively for their discovery in muscle and heart tissue), and encoded by the LDHA and LDHB genes, respectively. In addition to the two standard homotetramers, 4A and 4B (called LDH-5 and LDH-1 respectively), these two subunits may also randomly form 3 mixed tetramers: 3B1A, 2B2A, and 1B3A (called LDH-2, LDH-3, and LDH-4 respectively). The LDHC homotetramer is sometimes called LDH-6. These six isoforms are enzymatically similar but show different tissue distribution.

- LDH-1 (4B)—in the heart and in RBC (red blood cells), as well as the brain
- LDH-2 (3B1A)—in the reticuloendothelial system
- LDH-3 (2B2A)—in the lungs
- LDH-4 (1B3A)—in the kidneys, placenta, and pancreas
- LDH-5 (4A)—in the liver and striated muscle, also present in the brain
- LDH-6 (4C)—sperm cell precursors

LDH-2 is usually the predominant form in the serum. An LDH-1 level higher than the LDH-2 level (a "flipped pattern") suggests myocardial infarction (damage to heart tissues releases heart LDH, which is rich in LDH-1, into the bloodstream). The use of this phenomenon to diagnose infarction has been largely superseded by the use of Troponin I or T measurement.

In addition, there may sometimes be a readthrough-form of LDHB, denoted LDHBx, which is a peroxisome-specific LDH protein. LDHBx is generated by translation of the LDHB mRNA, but the stop codon is interpreted as an amino acid-encoding codon. In consequence, translation continues to the next stop codon. This leads to the addition of seven amino acid residues to the normal LDH-H protein. The extension contains a peroxisomal targeting signal, so that LDHBx is imported into the peroxisome.

lactate dehydrogenase A (subunit M)
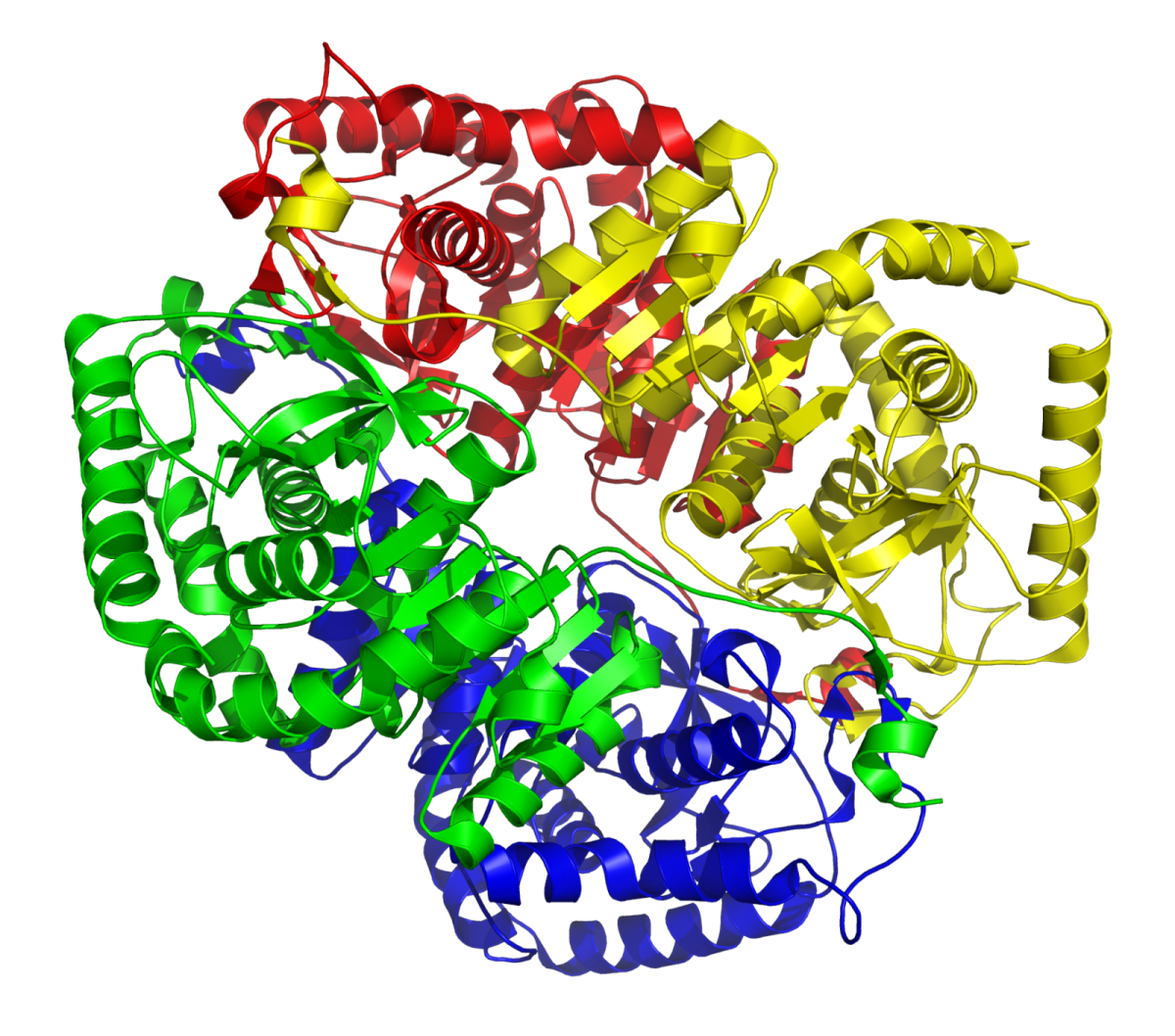
- Human lactate dehydrogenase M_{4} (the isoenzyme found in skeletal muscle). From PDB: 1I10.

Identifiers
- Symbol: LDHA
- Alt. symbols: LDHM
- NCBI gene: 3939
- HGNC: 6535
- OMIM: 150000
- RefSeq: NM_005566
- UniProt: P00338

Other data
- EC number: 1.1.1.27
- Locus: Chr. 11 p15.4
Search for
- Structures: Swiss-model
- Domains: InterPro

lactate dehydrogenase B (subunit H)
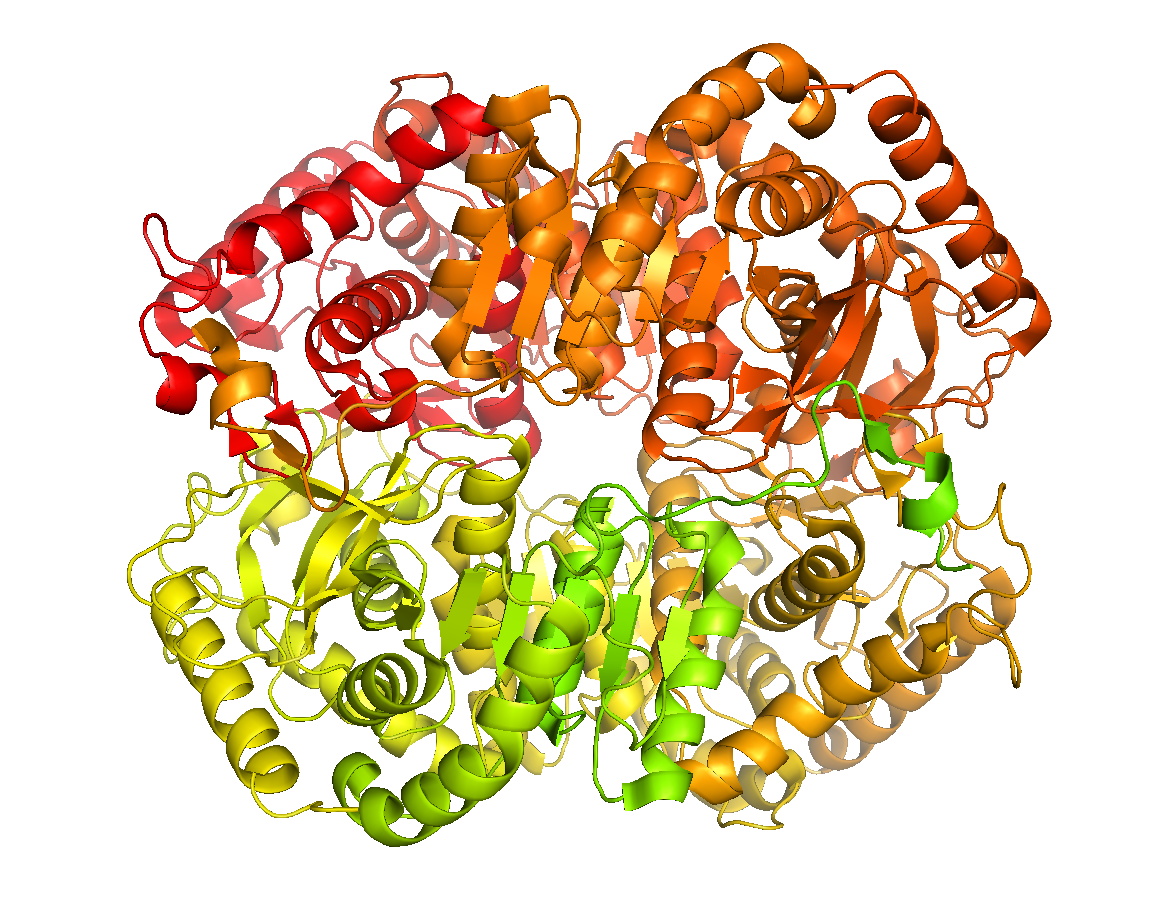
- Crystal structure of B-lactate dehydrogenase. From PDB: 1T2F.

Identifiers
- Symbol: LDHB
- Alt. symbols: LDHL
- NCBI gene: 3945
- HGNC: 6541
- OMIM: 150100
- RefSeq: NM_002300
- UniProt: P07195

Other data
- EC number: 1.1.1.27
- Locus: Chr. 12 p12.2–12.1
Search for
- Structures: Swiss-model
- Domains: InterPro

lactate dehydrogenase C
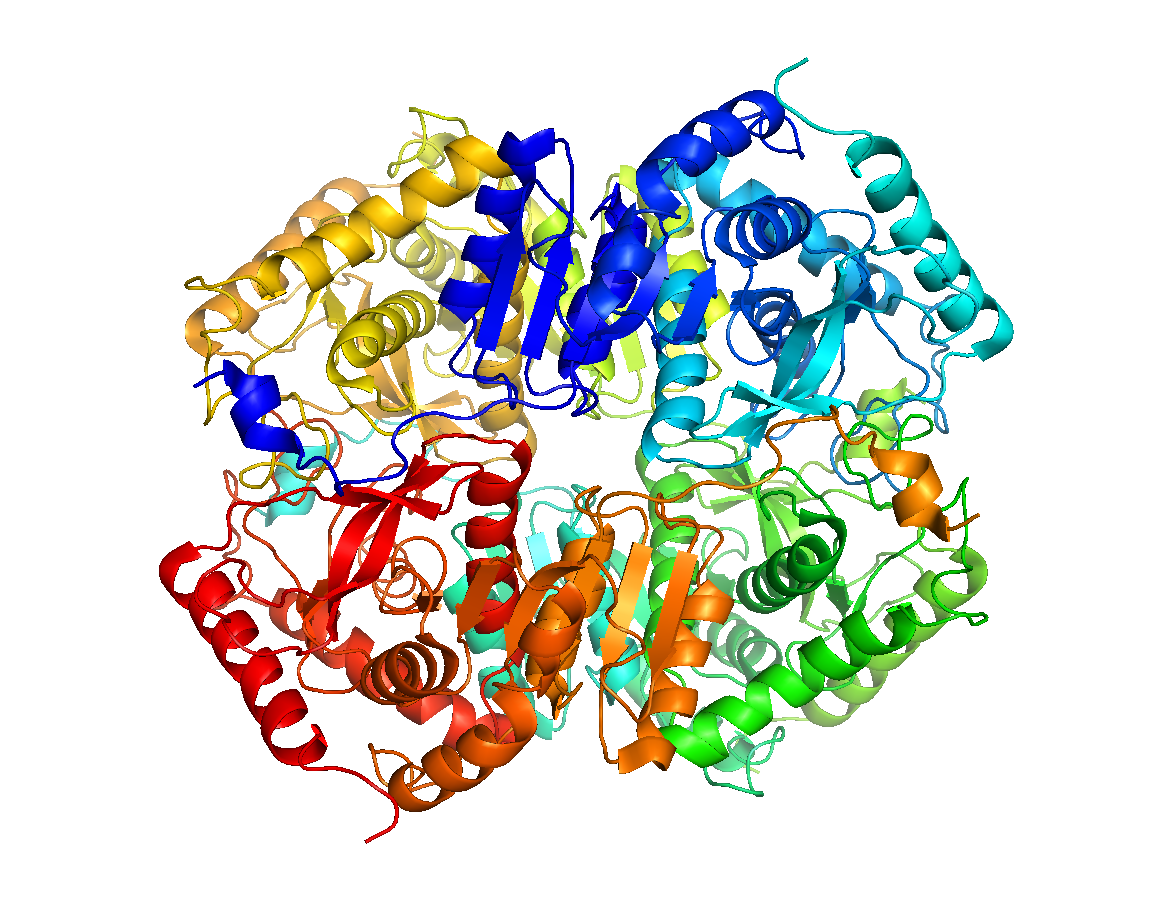
- Crystal structure of Mouse Testicular Lactate dehydrogenase (C_{4}). From PDB: 2LDX.

Identifiers
- Symbol: LDHC
- NCBI gene: 3948
- HGNC: 6544
- OMIM: 150150
- RefSeq: NM_002301
- UniProt: P07864

Other data
- EC number: 1.1.1.27
- Locus: Chr. 11 p15.5–15.3
Search for
- Structures: Swiss-model
- Domains: InterPro

== Protein families ==
D-lactate dehydrogenase, membrane binding
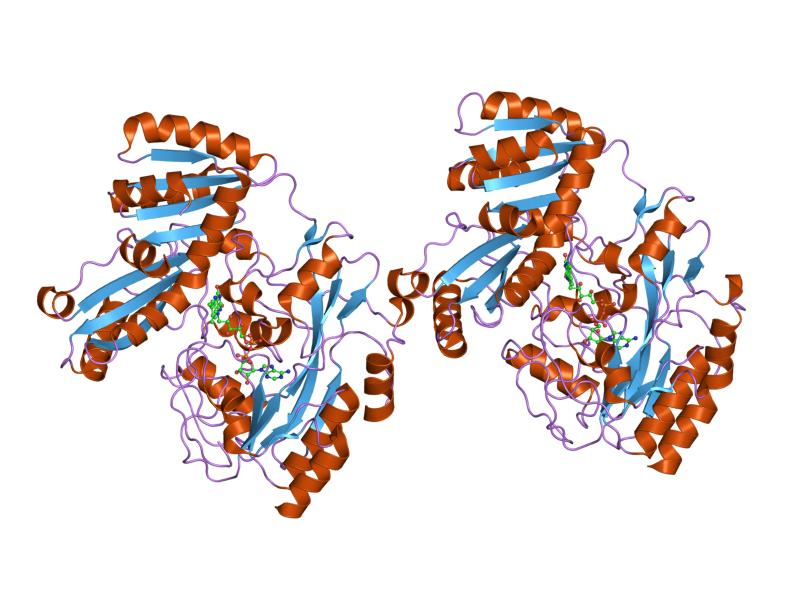
- crystal structure of d-lactate dehydrogenase, a peripheral membrane respiratory enzyme.

Identifiers
- Symbol: Lact-deh-memb
- Pfam: PF09330
- Pfam clan: CL0277
- InterPro: IPR015409
- SCOP2: 1f0x / SCOPe / SUPFAM
Available protein structures:
- PDB: IPR015409 PF09330 (ECOD; PDBsum)
- AlphaFold: IPR015409; PF09330

lactate/malate dehydrogenase, NAD binding domain

Identifiers
- Symbol: Ldh_1_N
- Pfam: PF00056
- Pfam clan: CL0063
- InterPro: IPR001236
- SCOP2: 6ldh / SCOPe / SUPFAM
Available protein structures:
- PDB: IPR001236 PF00056 (ECOD; PDBsum)
- AlphaFold: IPR001236; PF00056

lactate/malate dehydrogenase, alpha/beta C-terminal domain

Identifiers
- Symbol: Ldh_1_C
- Pfam: PF02866
- Pfam clan: CL0341
- InterPro: IPR022383
- PROSITE: PDOC00066
- SCOP2: 6ldh / SCOPe / SUPFAM
Available protein structures:
- PDB: IPR022383 PF02866 (ECOD; PDBsum)
- AlphaFold: IPR022383; PF02866

The family also contains L-lactate dehydrogenases that catalyse the conversion of pyruvate to L-lactate, the last step in anaerobic glycolysis. Malate dehydrogenases that catalyse the interconversion of malate to oxaloacetate and participate in the citric acid cycle, and L-2-hydroxyisocaproate dehydrogenases are also members of the family. The N-terminus is a Rossmann NAD-binding fold and the C-terminus is an unusual alpha+beta fold.

== Interactive pathway map ==
Click on genes, proteins and metabolites below to link to respective articles. (Note: The interactive pathway map can be edited at WikiPathways: "GlycolysisGluconeogenesis_WP534".)

Glycolysis and Gluconeogenesis edit

== Enzyme regulation ==
This protein may use the morpheein model of allosteric regulation.

=== Ethanol-induced hypoglycemia ===
Ethanol is dehydrogenated to acetaldehyde by alcohol dehydrogenase, and further into acetyl CoA by acetaldehyde dehydrogenase. During this reaction 2 NADH are produced. If large amounts of ethanol are present, then large amounts of NADH are produced, leading to a depletion of NAD^{+}. Thus, the conversion of pyruvate to lactate is increased due to the associated regeneration of NAD^{+}. Therefore, anion-gap metabolic acidosis (lactic acidosis) may ensue in ethanol poisoning.

The increased NADH/NAD+ ratio also can cause hypoglycemia in an (otherwise) fasting individual who has been drinking and is dependent on gluconeogenesis to maintain blood glucose levels. Alanine and lactate are major gluconeogenic precursors that enter gluconeogenesis as pyruvate. The high NADH/NAD+ ratio shifts the lactate dehydrogenase equilibrium to lactate, so that less pyruvate can be formed and, therefore, gluconeogenesis is impaired.

=== Substrate regulation ===
LDH is also regulated by the relative concentrations of its substrates. LDH becomes more active under periods of extreme muscular output due to an increase in substrates for the LDH reaction. When skeletal muscles are pushed to produce high levels of power, the demand for ATP in regards to aerobic ATP supply leads to an accumulation of free ADP, AMP, and Pi. The subsequent glycolytic flux, specifically production of pyruvate, exceeds the capacity for pyruvate dehydrogenase and other shuttle enzymes to metabolize pyruvate. The flux through LDH increases in response to increased levels of pyruvate and NADH to metabolize pyruvate into lactate.

=== Transcriptional regulation ===
LDH undergoes transcriptional regulation by PGC-1α. PGC-1α regulates LDH by decreasing LDH A mRNA transcription and the enzymatic activity of pyruvate to lactate conversion.

== Genetics ==
The M and H subunits are encoded by two different genes:

- The M subunit is encoded by LDHA, located on chromosome 11p15.4 (Online Mendelian Inheritance in Man (OMIM): 150000).
- The H subunit is encoded by LDHB, located on chromosome 12p12.2-p12.1 (Online Mendelian Inheritance in Man (OMIM): 150100).
- A third isoform, LDHC or LDHX, is expressed only in the testis (Online Mendelian Inheritance in Man (OMIM): 150150); its gene is likely a duplicate of LDHA and is also located on the eleventh chromosome (11p15.5-p15.3).
- The fourth isoform is localized in the peroxisome. It is tetramer containing one LDHBx subunit, which is also encoded by the LDHB gene. The LDHBx protein is seven amino acids longer than the LDHB (LDH-H) protein. This amino acid extension is generated by functional translational readthrough.

Mutations of the M subunit have been linked to the rare disease exertional myoglobinuria (see OMIM article), and mutations of the H subunit have been described but do not appear to lead to disease.

=== Mutations ===
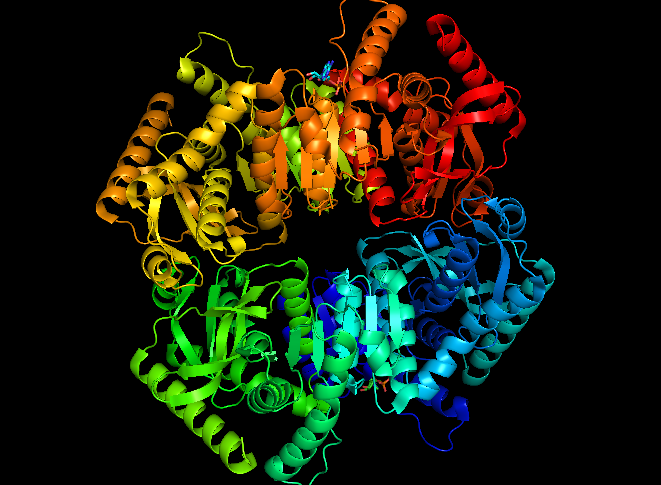
This is a mutant version of the LDH-5 enzyme, which is usually found in skeletal muscle

In rare cases, a mutation in the genes controlling the production of lactate dehydrogenase will lead to a medical condition known as lactate dehydrogenase deficiency. Depending on which gene carries the mutation, one of two types will occur: either lactate dehydrogenase-A deficiency (also known as glycogen storage disease XI) or lactate dehydrogenase-B deficiency. Both of these conditions affect how the body breaks down sugars, primarily in certain muscle cells. Lactate dehydrogenase-A deficiency is caused by a mutation to the LDHA gene, while lactate dehydrogenase-B deficiency is caused by a mutation to the LDHB gene.

This condition is inherited in an autosomal recessive pattern, meaning that both parents must contribute a mutated gene in order for this condition to be expressed.

A complete lactate dehydrogenase enzyme consists of four protein subunits. Since the two most common subunits found in lactate dehydrogenase are encoded by the LDHA and LDHB genes, either variation of this disease causes abnormalities in many of the lactate dehydrogenase enzymes found in the body. In the case of lactate dehydrogenase-A deficiency, mutations to the LDHA gene result in the production of an abnormal lactate dehydrogenase-A subunit that cannot bind to the other subunits to form the complete enzyme. This lack of a functional subunit reduces the amount of enzyme formed, leading to an overall decrease in activity. During the anaerobic phase of glycolysis (the Cori cycle), the mutated enzyme is unable to convert pyruvate into lactate to produce the extra energy the cells need. Since this subunit has the highest concentration in the LDH enzymes found in the skeletal muscles (which are the primary muscles responsible for movement), high-intensity physical activity will lead to an insufficient amount of energy being produced during this anaerobic phase. This in turn will cause the muscle tissue to weaken and eventually break down, a condition known as rhabdomyolysis. The process of rhabdomyolysis also releases myoglobin into the blood, which will eventually end up in the urine and cause it to become red or brown: another condition known as myoglobinuria. Some other common symptoms are exercise intolerance, which consists of fatigue, muscle pain, and cramps during exercise, and skin rashes. In severe cases, myoglobinuria can damage the kidneys and lead to life-threatening kidney failure. In order to obtain a definitive diagnosis, a muscle biopsy may be performed to confirm low or absent LDH activity. There is currently no specific treatment for this condition.

In the case of lactate dehydrogenase-B deficiency, mutations to the LDHB gene result in the production of an abnormal lactate dehydrogenase-B subunit that cannot bind to the other subunits to form the complete enzyme. As with lactate dehydrogenase-A deficiency, this mutation reduces the overall effectiveness in the enzyme. However, there are some major differences between these two cases. The first is the location where the condition manifests itself. With lactate dehydrogenase-B deficiency, the highest concentration of B subunits can be found within the cardiac muscle, or the heart. Within the heart, lactate dehydrogenase plays the role of converting lactate back into pyruvate so that the pyruvate can be used again to create more energy. With the mutated enzyme, the overall rate of this conversion is decreased. However, unlike lactate dehydrogenase-A deficiency, this mutation does not appear to cause any symptoms or health problems linked to this condition. At the present moment, it is unclear why this is the case. Affected individuals are usually discovered only when routine blood tests indicate low LDH levels present within the blood.

== Role in muscular fatigue ==
The onset of acidosis during periods of intense exercise is commonly attributed to accumulation of hydrogens that are dissociated from lactate. Previously, lactic acid was thought to cause fatigue. From this reasoning, the idea of lactate production being a primary cause of muscle fatigue during exercise was widely adopted. A closer, mechanistic analysis of lactate production under "anaerobic" conditions shows that there is no biochemical evidence for the production of lactate through LDH contributing to acidosis. While LDH activity is correlated to muscle fatigue, the production of lactate by means of the LDH complex works as a system to delay the onset of muscle fatigue. George Brooks and Colleagues at UC Berkeley where the lactate shuttle was discovered showed that lactate was actually a metabolic fuel not a waste product or the cause of fatigue.

LDH works to prevent muscular failure and fatigue in multiple ways. The lactate-forming reaction generates cytosolic NAD+, which feeds into the glyceraldehyde 3-phosphate dehydrogenase reaction to help maintain cytosolic redox potential and promote substrate flux through the second phase of glycolysis to promote ATP generation. This, in effect, provides more energy to contracting muscles under heavy workloads. The production and removal of lactate from the cell also ejects a proton consumed in the LDH reaction- the removal of excess protons produced in the wake of this fermentation reaction serves to act as a buffer system for muscle acidosis. Once proton accumulation exceeds the rate of uptake in lactate production and removal through the LDH symport, muscular acidosis occurs.

== Blood test ==
Reference ranges for blood tests for lactate dehydrogenase
Lower limit	Upper limit	Unit	Comments
50	150	U/L	
0.4	1.7	μmol/L	
1.8	3.4	μkat/L	< 70 years old

On blood tests, an elevated level of lactate dehydrogenase usually indicates tissue damage, which has multiple potential causes, reflecting its widespread tissue distribution:

- Hemolytic anemia
- Vitamin B12 deficiency anemia
- Infections such as infectious mononucleosis, meningitis, encephalitis, HIV/AIDS. It is notably increased in sepsis.
- Infarction, such as bowel infarction, myocardial infarction and lung infarction
- Acute kidney disease
- Acute liver disease
- Rhabdomyolysis
- Pancreatitis
- Bone fractures
- Cancers, notably testicular cancer and lymphoma. A high LDH after chemotherapy may indicate that it has not been successful.
- Severe shock
- Hypoxia

Low and normal levels of LDH do not usually indicate any pathology. Low levels may be caused by large intake of vitamin C.

LDH is a protein that normally appears throughout the body in small amounts.

=== Testing in cancer ===
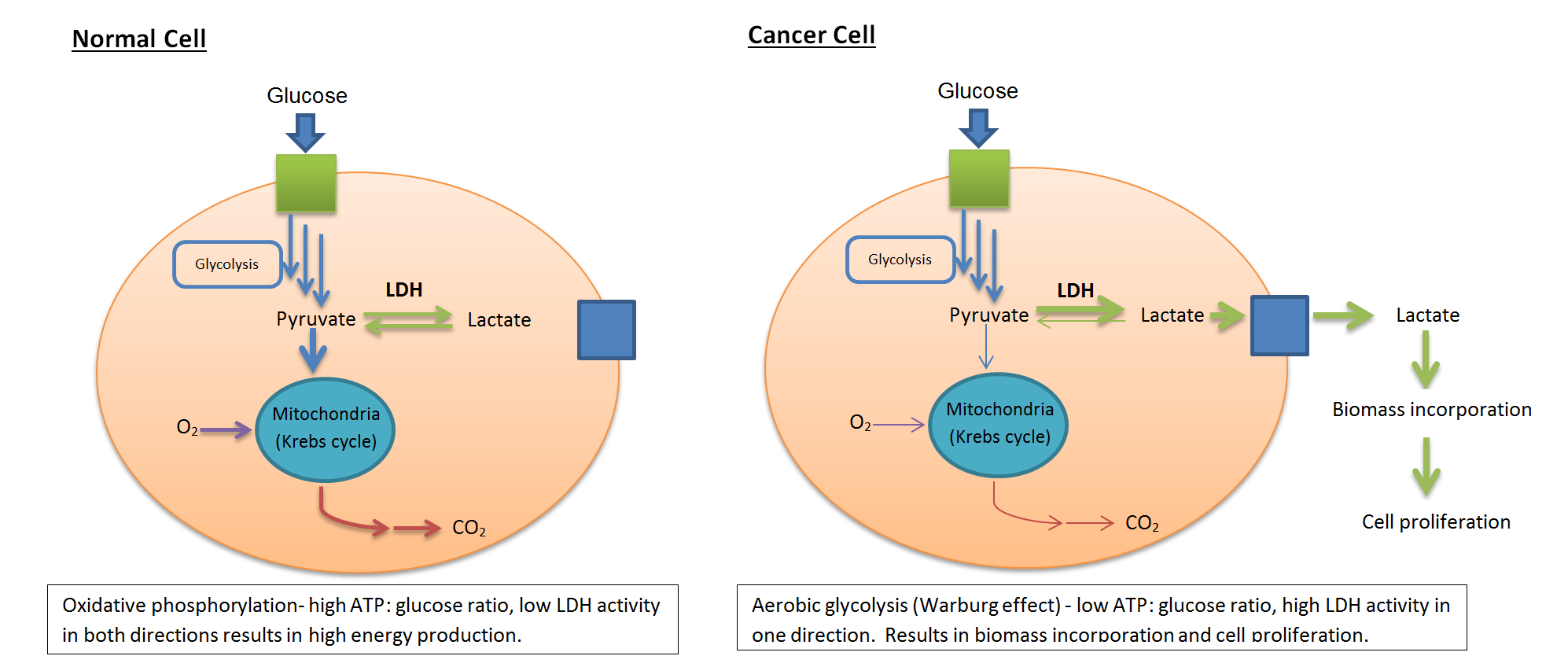
Comparison of LDH activity in normal and cancerous cells

Many cancers can raise LDH levels, so LDH may be used as a tumor marker, but at the same time, it is not useful in identifying a specific kind of cancer. Measuring LDH levels can be helpful in monitoring treatment for cancer. Noncancerous conditions that can raise LDH levels include heart failure, hypothyroidism, anemia, pre-eclampsia, meningitis, encephalitis, acute pancreatitis, HIV and lung or liver disease.

Tissue breakdown releases LDH, and therefore, LDH can be measured as a surrogate for tissue breakdown (e.g., hemolysis). LDH is measured by the lactate dehydrogenase (LDH) test (also known as the LDH test or lactic acid dehydrogenase test). Comparison of the measured LDH values with the normal range help guide diagnosis.

=== Hemolysis ===
In medicine, LDH is often used as a marker of tissue breakdown as LDH is abundant in red blood cells and can function as a marker for hemolysis. A blood sample that has been handled incorrectly can show false-positively high levels of LDH due to erythrocyte damage.

It can also be used as a marker of myocardial infarction. Following a myocardial infarction, levels of LDH peak at 3–4 days and remain elevated for up to 10 days. In this way, elevated levels of LDH (where the level of LDH1 is higher than that of LDH2, i.e. the LDH Flip, as normally, in serum, LDH2 is higher than LDH1) can be useful for determining whether a patient has had a myocardial infarction if they come to doctors several days after an episode of chest pain.

=== Tissue turnover ===
Other uses are assessment of tissue breakdown in general; this is possible when there are no other indicators of hemolysis. It is used to follow up cancer (especially lymphoma) patients, as cancer cells have a high rate of turnover, with destroyed cells leading to an elevated LDH activity.

=== HIV ===
LDH is often measured in HIV patients as a non-specific marker for pneumonia due to Pneumocystis jirovecii (PCP). Elevated LDH in the setting of upper respiratory symptoms in a HIV patient suggests, but is not diagnostic for, PCP. However, in HIV-positive patients with respiratory symptoms, a very high LDH level (>600 IU/L) indicated histoplasmosis (9.33 times more likely) in a study of 120 PCP and 30 histoplasmosis patients.

== Testing in other body fluids ==
=== Exudates and transudates ===
Measuring LDH in fluid aspirated from a pleural effusion (or pericardial effusion) can help in the distinction between exudates (actively secreted fluid, e.g., due to inflammation) or transudates (passively secreted fluid, due to a high hydrostatic pressure or a low oncotic pressure). The usual criterion (included in Light's criteria) is that a ratio of pleural LDH to serum LDH greater than 0.6 or 2/3 the upper limit of the normal laboratory value for serum LDH indicates an exudate, while a ratio of less indicates a transudate. Different laboratories have different values for the upper limit of serum LDH, but examples include 200 and 300 IU/L. In empyema, the LDH levels, in general, will exceed 1000 IU/L.

=== Meningitis and encephalitis ===
High levels of lactate dehydrogenase in cerebrospinal fluid are often associated with bacterial meningitis. In the case of viral meningitis, high LDH, in general, indicates the presence of encephalitis and poor prognosis.

== In cancer treatment ==
LDH is involved in tumor initiation and metabolism. Cancer cells rely on increased glycolysis resulting in increased lactate production in addition to aerobic respiration in the mitochondria, even under oxygen-sufficient conditions (a process known as the Warburg effect). This state of fermentative glycolysis is catalyzed by the A form of LDH. This mechanism allows tumorous cells to convert the majority of their glucose stores into lactate regardless of oxygen availability, shifting use of glucose metabolites from simple energy production to the promotion of accelerated cell growth and replication.

LDH A and the possibility of inhibiting its activity has been identified as a promising target in cancer treatments focused on preventing carcinogenic cells from proliferating. Chemical inhibition of LDH A has demonstrated marked changes in metabolic processes and overall survival of carcinoma cells. Oxamate is a cytosolic inhibitor of LDH A that significantly decreases ATP production in tumorous cells as well as increasing production of reactive oxygen species (ROS). These ROS drive cancer cell proliferation by activating kinases that drive cell cycle progression growth factors at low concentrations, but can damage DNA through oxidative stress at higher concentrations. Secondary lipid oxidation products can also inactivate LDH and impact its ability to regenerate NADH, directly disrupting the enzymes ability to convert lactate to pyruvate.

While recent studies have shown that LDH activity is not necessarily an indicator of metastatic risk, LDH expression can act as a general marker in the prognosis of cancers. Expression of LDH5 and VEGF in tumors and the stroma has been found to be a strong prognostic factor for diffuse or mixed-type gastric cancers.

== Prokaryotes ==
A cap-membrane-binding domain is found in prokaryotic lactate dehydrogenase. This consists of a large seven-stranded antiparallel beta-sheet flanked on both sides by alpha-helices. It allows for membrane association.

== See also ==
- Dehydrogenase
- Erythrocyte lactate transporter defect (formerly, myopathy due to lactate transport defect)
- Glycogen storage disease
- Lactate
- Metabolic myopathies
- Oxidoreductase
