= Oxamate carbamoyltransferase =

Class of enzymes

oxamate carbamoyltransferase

Identifiers
- EC no.: 2.1.3.5
- CAS no.: 62213-52-9

Databases
- IntEnz: IntEnz view
- BRENDA: BRENDA entry
- ExPASy: NiceZyme view
- KEGG: KEGG entry
- MetaCyc: metabolic pathway
- PRIAM: profile
- PDB structures: RCSB PDB PDBe PDBsum
- Gene Ontology: AmiGO / QuickGO
Search
- PMC: articles
- PubMed: articles
- NCBI: proteins

In enzymology, oxamate carbamoyltransferase (EC 2.1.3.5) is an enzyme that catalyzes the chemical reaction

carbamoyl phosphate
+
oxamic acid
H_{2}PO^{−}_{4}
H_{2}PO^{−}_{4}
oxaluric acid

The enzyme converts oxamic acid to oxaluric acid, with inorganic phosphate as a byproduct.

This enzyme belongs to the family of transferases that transfer one-carbon groups, specifically the carboxy- and carbamoyltransferases. The systematic name of this enzyme class is carbamoyl-phosphate:oxamate carbamoyltransferase. This enzyme is also called oxamic transcarbamylase. This enzyme participates in purine metabolism.
