= Oximide =

Names
- IUPAC name Aziridine-2,3-dione
- Other names Oxalimide; 2,3-Aziridinedione

Identifiers
CAS Number	598-60-7
3D model (JSmol)	Interactive image
ChemSpider	4675226
PubChem CID	5743229
UNII	5X6266ZZP9
CompTox Dashboard (EPA)	DTXSID10208535
- InChI: InChI=1S/C2HNO2/c4-1-2(5)3-1/h(H,3,4,5) Key: MEVHTHLQPUQANE-UHFFFAOYSA-N
- SMILES: C1(=O)C(=O)N1

Properties
Chemical formula	C_{2}HNO_{2}
Molar mass	71.035 g·mol^{−1}
- Except where otherwise noted, data are given for materials in their standard state (at 25 °C [77 °F], 100 kPa). Infobox references

Oximide is an unstable chemical compound, the cyclic imide of oxalic acid. Other names for this are the systematic name 2,3-Aziridinedione or oxalimide. The chemical formula is C_{2}HNO_{2}. Its core is a three member heterocycle, aziridine.

== Production ==
In 1886 Ost and Mente claimed to produce oximide by the reaction of oxamic acid with phosphorus pentachloride (PCl_{5}). However, a product with a six member ring, tetraketopiperazine, may have been produced instead. Later attempts to reproduce the production of oximide by this method were a failure. The first successful manufacture of oximide was by Hiromu Aoyama, Masami Sakamoto, and Yoshimori Omote in 1980.

== Properties ==
Aziridine-2,3-dione has an infrared absorption band at 1954 cm^{−1}.

== Related ==
The term "oximide" has also been used for oximes.

Derivatives of oximide exist where the hydrogen atom is substituted by other organic groups such as methyl or phenyl. When 4-methyl-1,2,4-triazolinedione is irradiated by ultraviolet light with wavelength 335 nm in a noble gas matrix, some methylaziridine-2,3-dione is made (along with isocyanates, carbon monoxide and dinitrogen). Similarly 4-phenyl-1,2,4-triazolinedione irradiated by ultraviolet light with wavelength 310 nm makes some phenylaziridine-2,3-dione. Shorter wavelength ultraviolet light decomposes these compounds to isocyanates (-NCO).

Another method to produce oximide derivatives is by the photolysis of substituted diphenylmaleylimide ozonide at liquid nitrogen temperature (77K) in a potassium bromide matrix. Derivatives made this way are methyl, isopropyl and phenylethyl-aziridine-2,3-dione. These compounds are unstable at higher temperatures, and when heated, decompose to carbon monoxide and isocyanates.
