= Lactate dehydrogenase A =

Type of enzyme

LDHA
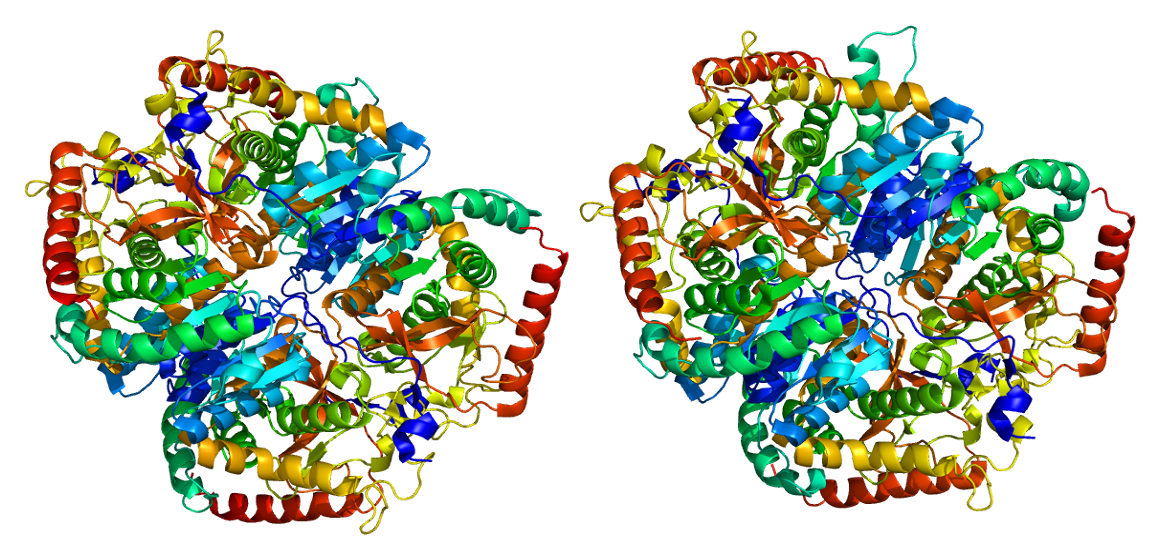

Identifiers
- Aliases: LDHA, GSD11, HEL-S-133P, LDH1, LDHM, PIG19, lactate dehydrogenase A
- External IDs: OMIM: 150000; MGI: 96759; GeneCards: LDHA
Available structures
PDB	Ortholog search: PDBe RCSB
PDB	List of PDB id codes 1I10, 4AJP, 4JNK, 4L4R, 4L4S, 4M49, 4OJN, 4OKN, 4QO7, 4QO8, 4QSM, 4QT0, 4R68, 4R69, 4RLS, 4ZVV
Enzyme activity
EC #	BRENDA	ExPASy	KEGG	MetaCyc
1.1.1.27	↗	↗	↗	↗

Gene location (Human)
Chr.	Chromosome 11 (human)
Band	11p15.1	Start	18,394,560 bp
Band	11p15.1	End	18,408,425 bp

Gene location (Mouse)
Chr.	Chromosome 7 (mouse)
Band	7 B3|7 30.6 cM	Start	46,490,899 bp
Band	7 B3|7 30.6 cM	End	46,505,051 bp
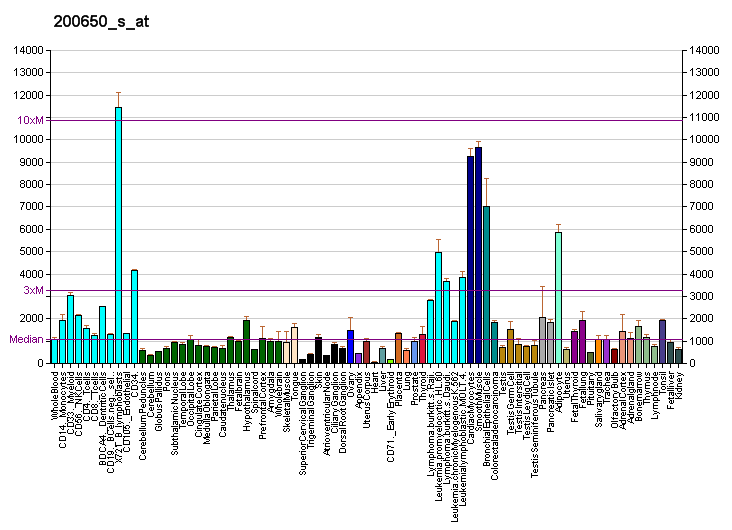
RNA expression pattern
Bgee	Human / Mouse (ortholog); Top expressed in: ventricular zone; skin of leg; tibial arteries; skin of abdomen; muscle of leg; Achilles tendon; epithelium of colon; ascending aorta; right adrenal gland; gastrocnemius muscle / Top expressed in: otic placode; somite; primitive streak; otic vesicle; epiblast; triceps brachii muscle; vastus lateralis muscle; sternocleidomastoid muscle; medial head of gastrocnemius muscle; saccule; More reference expression data
BioGPS	More reference expression data
Gene ontology
Molecular function	oxidoreductase activity, acting on the CH-OH group of donors, NAD or NADP as acceptor; NAD binding; lactate dehydrogenase activity; kinase binding; protein binding; catalytic activity; identical protein binding; oxidoreductase activity; L-lactate dehydrogenase activity; cadherin binding
Cellular component	cytoplasm; membrane; extracellular exosome; nucleus; cytosol
Biological process	post-embryonic animal organ development; lactate metabolic process; response to hypoxia; glycolytic process; response to organic cyclic compound; substantia nigra development; response to nutrient; carboxylic acid metabolic process; response to glucose; NAD metabolic process; response to estrogen; pyruvate metabolic process; positive regulation of apoptotic process; response to cAMP; response to hydrogen peroxide; carbohydrate metabolic process
Sources:Amigo / QuickGO
Orthologs
Databases	NCBI: entry; OMA: entry
Species	Human	Mouse
Entrez	3939	16828
Ensembl	ENSG00000134333; ENSG00000288299	ENSMUSG00000063229
UniProt	P00338	P06151
RefSeq (mRNA)	NM_001135239; NM_001165414; NM_001165415; NM_001165416; NM_005566	NM_001136069; NM_010699
RefSeq (protein)	NP_001128711; NP_001158886; NP_001158887; NP_001158888; NP_005557	NP_001129541; NP_034829
Location (UCSC)	Chr 11: 18.39 – 18.41 Mb	Chr 7: 46.49 – 46.51 Mb
PubMed search
- Wikidata
View/Edit Human	View/Edit Mouse

Lactate dehydrogenase A (LDHA) is an enzyme which in humans is encoded by the LDHA gene. It is a monomer of lactate dehydrogenase, which exists as a tetramer. The other main subunit is lactate dehydrogenase B (LDHB).

== Function ==
Lactate dehydrogenase A catalyzes the inter-conversion of pyruvate and L-lactate with concomitant inter-conversion of NADH and NAD^{+}. LDHA is found in most somatic tissues, though predominantly in muscle tissue and tumors, and belongs to the lactate dehydrogenase family. It has long been known that many human cancers have higher LDHA levels compared to normal tissues. It has also been shown that LDHA plays an important role in the development, invasion and metastasis of malignancies. Mutations in LDHA have been linked to exertional myoglobinuria.

== Interactive pathway map ==
Click on genes, proteins and metabolites below to link to respective articles. (Note: The interactive pathway map can be edited at WikiPathways: "GlycolysisGluconeogenesis_WP534".)

Glycolysis and Gluconeogenesis edit

== LDHA Inhibitors ==
The following compounds have been demonstrated to inhibit the LDHA enzyme:

- Oxamate
- Epigallocatechin gallate
- Quinoline 3-sulfonamide
- CHK-336
