= Transudate =

Extravascular fluid with a low protein and specific gravity

Transudate is extravascular fluid with low protein content and a low specific gravity (< 1.012). It has low nucleated cell counts (less than 500 to 1000 per microliter) and the primary cell types are mononuclear cells: macrophages, lymphocytes and mesothelial cells. For instance, an ultrafiltrate of blood plasma is transudate. It results from increased fluid pressures or diminished colloid oncotic forces in the plasma.

== Transudate vs. exudate ==
Transudate vs. exudate
| | Transudate | Exudate |
| Main causes | ↑ hydrostatic pressure, ↓ colloid osmotic pressure | Inflammation, increased vascular permeability |
| Appearance | Clear | Cloudy |
| Specific gravity | < 1.012 | > 1.020 |
| Protein content | < 2.5 g/dL | > 2.9 g/dL |
| fluid [protein] s̅e̅r̅u̅m̅ [p̅r̅o̅t̅e̅i̅n̅] | < 0.5 | > 0.5 |
| SAAG = serum [albumin] − fluid [albumin] | > 1.2 g/dL | < 1.2 g/dL |
| fluid LDH u̅p̅p̅e̅r̅ l̅i̅m̅i̅t̅ f̅o̅r̅ s̅e̅r̅u̅m̅ | < 0.6 or < 2/3 | > 0.6 or > 2/3 |
| Cholesterol content | < 45 mg/dL | > 45 mg/dL |
| Radiodensity on CT scan | 2 to 15 HU | 4 to 33 HU |

There is an important distinction between transudates and exudates. Transudates are caused by disturbances of hydrostatic or colloid osmotic pressure, not by inflammation. They have a low protein content in comparison to exudates and thus appear clearer.

Levels of lactate dehydrogenase (LDH) or a Rivalta test can be used to distinguish transudate from exudate.

Their main role in nature is to protect elements of the skin and other subcutaneous substances against the contact effects of external climate and the environment and other substances – it also plays a role in integumental hygiene.

== Pathology ==
The most common causes of pathologic transudate include conditions that:

- Increase hydrostatic pressure in vessels: left ventricular heart failure,
- Decrease oncotic pressure in blood vessels:
  - Cirrhosis (Cirrhosis leads to hypoalbuminemia and decreasing of colloid oncotic pressure in plasma that causes edema)
  - Nephrotic syndrome (also due to hypoalbuminemia caused by proteinuria).
  - Malnutrition (hypoalbuminism)

== See also ==
- Exudate
