= C2HNO2 =

The molecular formula C_{2}HNO_{2} (molar mass: 71.03 g/mol, exact mass: 71.0007 u) may refer to:

- Carbonocyanidic acid
- Formyl cyanate
- (Hydroxyimino)ethenone HONCCO
- 2-Nitrosoethenone ONC(H)CO
- Oximide
