= Ureidoglycolate dehydrogenase =

Class of enzymes

ureidoglycolate dehydrogenase

Identifiers
- EC no.: 1.1.1.154
- CAS no.: 62213-62-1

Databases
- IntEnz: IntEnz view
- BRENDA: BRENDA entry
- ExPASy: NiceZyme view
- KEGG: KEGG entry
- MetaCyc: metabolic pathway
- PRIAM: profile
- PDB structures: RCSB PDB PDBe PDBsum
- Gene Ontology: AmiGO / QuickGO
Search
- PMC: articles
- PubMed: articles
- NCBI: proteins

In enzymology, ureidoglycolate dehydrogenase (EC 1.1.1.154) is an enzyme that catalyzes the chemical reaction

(-)-ureidoglycolic acid
+ NAD^{+}
H^{+}
H^{+}
oxaluric acid
+ NADH

The two substrates of this enzyme are (-)-ureidoglycolic acid and oxidised nicotinamide adenine dinucleotide (NAD^{+}). Its products are oxaluric acid, reduced NADH, and a proton. This enzyme can use the alternative cofactor, nicotinamide adenine dinucleotide phosphate.

This enzyme belongs to the family of oxidoreductases, specifically those acting on the CH-OH group of donor with NAD^{+} or NADP^{+} as acceptor. The systematic name of this enzyme class is (S)-ureidoglycolate:NAD(P)^{+} oxidoreductase. This enzyme participates in purine metabolism.

== Structural studies ==
As of late 2007, two structures have been solved for this class of enzymes, with PDB accession codes 1WTJ and 1XRH.
