= Exudate =

Fluid emitted through pores or a wound

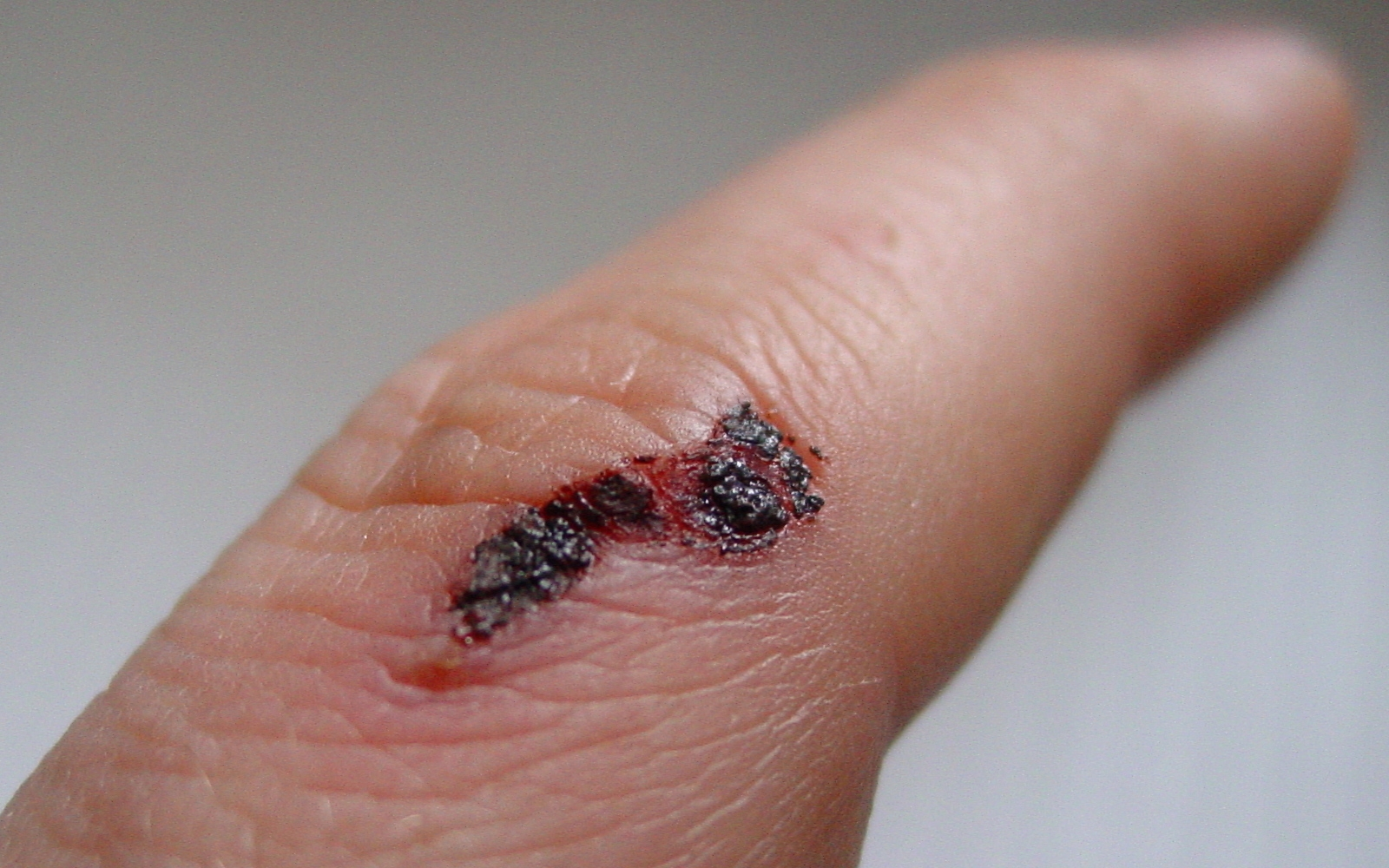
Exudate from a wound on a human finger

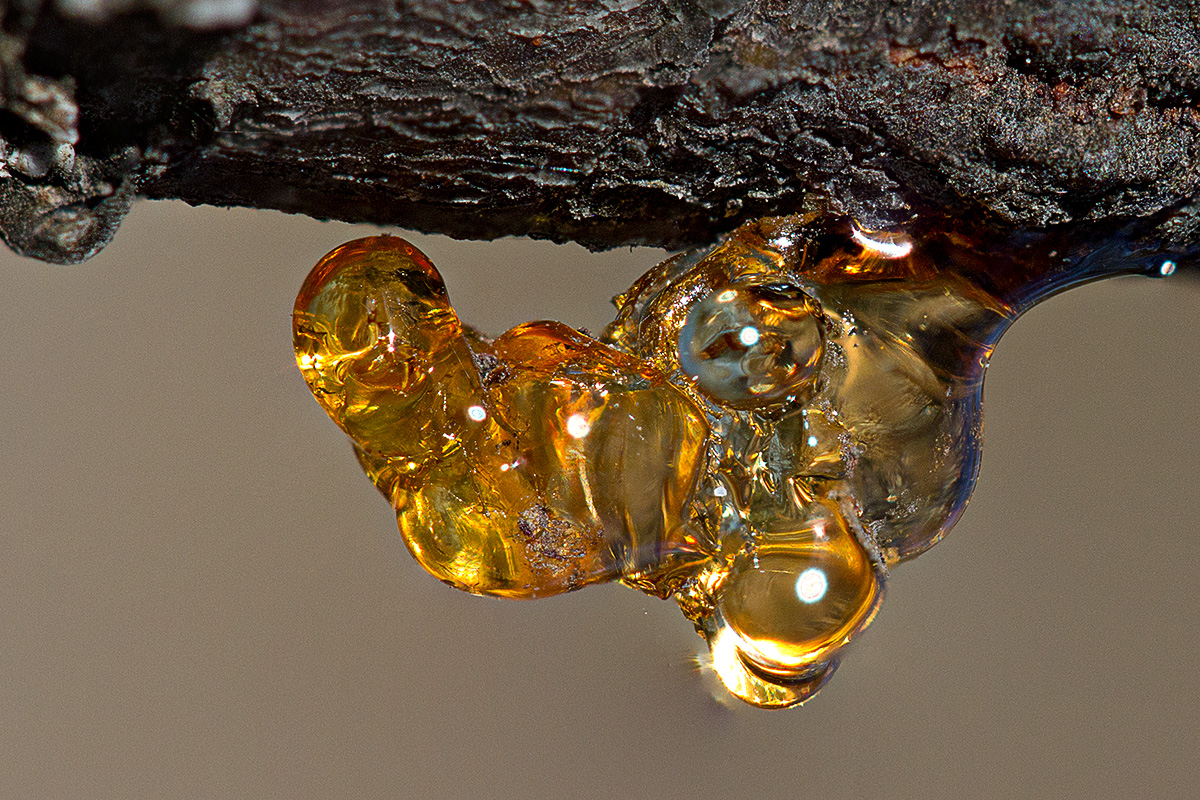
Tree resin is a type of plant exudate.

An exudate is a fluid released by an organism through pores or a wound, a process known as exuding or exudation. Exudate is derived from exude 'to ooze' from Latin exsūdāre 'to (ooze out) sweat' (ex- 'out' and sūdāre 'to sweat').

== Medicine ==
An exudate is any fluid that filters from the circulatory system into lesions or areas of inflammation. It can be a pus-like or clear fluid. When an injury occurs, leaving skin exposed, it leaks out of the blood vessels and into nearby tissues. The fluid is composed of serum, fibrin, and leukocytes. Exudate may ooze from cuts or from areas of infection or inflammation. Although blood itself is not an exudate, some types of exudates contain blood cells.

=== Types ===
Transudate vs. exudate
	Transudate	Exudate
Main causes	↑ hydrostatic pressure, ↓ colloid osmotic pressure	Inflammation, increased vascular permeability
Appearance	Clear	Cloudy
Specific gravity	< 1.012	> 1.020
Protein content	< 2.5 g/dL	> 2.9 g/dL
fluid [protein] s̅e̅r̅u̅m̅ [p̅r̅o̅t̅e̅i̅n̅]	< 0.5	> 0.5
SAAG = serum [albumin] − fluid [albumin]	> 1.2 g/dL	< 1.2 g/dL
fluid LDH u̅p̅p̅e̅r̅ l̅i̅m̅i̅t̅ f̅o̅r̅ s̅e̅r̅u̅m̅	< 0.6 or < 2/3	> 0.6 or > 2/3
Cholesterol content	< 45 mg/dL	> 45 mg/dL
Radiodensity on CT scan	2 to 15 HU	4 to 33 HU

- Purulent or suppurative exudate consists of plasma with both active and dead neutrophils, fibrinogen, and necrotic parenchymal cells. This kind of exudate is consistent with more severe infections, and is commonly referred to as pus.
- Fibrinous exudate is composed mainly of fibrinogen and fibrin. It is characteristic of rheumatic carditis, but is seen in all severe injuries such as strep throat and bacterial pneumonia. Fibrinous inflammation is often difficult to resolve due to blood vessels growing into the exudate and filling space that was occupied by fibrin. Often, large amounts of antibiotics are necessary for resolution.
- Catarrhal exudate is seen in the nose and throat and is characterized by a high content of mucus.
- Serous exudate (sometimes classified as serous transudate) is usually seen in mild inflammation, with relatively low protein. Its consistency resembles that of serum, and can usually be seen in certain disease states like tuberculosis. (See below for difference between transudate and exudate)
- Malignant (or cancerous) pleural effusion is effusion where cancer cells are present. It is usually classified as exudate.

Types of exudates: serous, serosanguineous, sanguineous, hemorrhaging and purulent drainage.

- Serous: Clear straw colored liquid that drains from the wound. This is a normal part of the healing process.
- Serosanguineous: Small amount of blood is present in the drainage; it is pink in color due to the presence of red blood cells mixed with serous drainage. This is a normal part of the healing process.
- Sanguineous: This type of drainage contains red blood due to trauma of blood vessels, this may occur while cleaning the wound. Sanguineous drainage is abnormal.
- Hemorrhaging: This type of drainage contains frank blood from a leaking blood vessel. This will require emergency treatment to control the bleed. This type of drainage is abnormal.
- Purulent drainage: This type of drainage is malodorous and can be yellow, gray, or greenish in color. This is an indication of an infection.

=== Exudates vs. transudates ===
There is an important distinction between transudates and exudates. Transudates are caused by disturbances of hydrostatic or colloid osmotic pressure, not by inflammation. They have a low protein content in comparison to exudates. Medical distinction between transudates and exudates is through the measurement of the specific gravity of extracted fluid. Specific gravity is used to measure the protein content of the fluid. The higher the specific gravity, the greater the likelihood of capillary permeability changes in relation to body cavities. For example, the specific gravity of the transudate is usually less than 1.012 and a protein content of less than 2 g/100 mL (2 g%). Rivalta test may be used to differentiate an exudate from a transudate. It is not clear if there is a distinction in the difference of transudates and exudates in plants.

== Plant exudates ==
Plant exudates include saps, gums, latex, resin, and kino. Sometimes nectar is considered an exudate. Plant seeds exudate a variety of molecules into the spermosphere, and roots exudate into the rhizosphere; these exudates include acids, sugars, polysaccharides and ectoenzymes, and collectively account for 40% of root carbon. Exudation of these compounds has various benefits to the plant and to the microorganisms of the rhizosphere.

== See also ==
- Honeydew (secretion)
- Guttation
- Pleural effusion
- Scarless wound healing
- Surfactant leaching
- Castoreum
