= Leaching (chemistry) =

Extraction of some soluble substances from a solid material into a liquid

Leaching is the process of a solute becoming detached or extracted from its carrier substance by way of a solvent.

Leaching is a naturally occurring process which scientists have adapted for a variety of applications with a variety of methods. Specific extraction methods depend on the soluble characteristics relative to the sorbent material such as concentration, distribution, nature, and size. Leaching can occur naturally seen from plant substances (inorganic and organic), solute leaching in soil, and in the decomposition of organic materials. Leaching can also be applied affectedly to enhance water quality and contaminant removal, as well as for disposal of hazardous waste products such as fly ash, or rare earth elements (REEs). Understanding leaching characteristics is important in preventing or encouraging the leaching process and preparing for it in the case where it is inevitable.

In an ideal leaching equilibrium stage, all the solute is dissolved by the solvent, leaving the carrier of the solute unchanged. The process of leaching however is not always ideal, and can be quite complex to understand and replicate, and often different methodologies will produce different results.

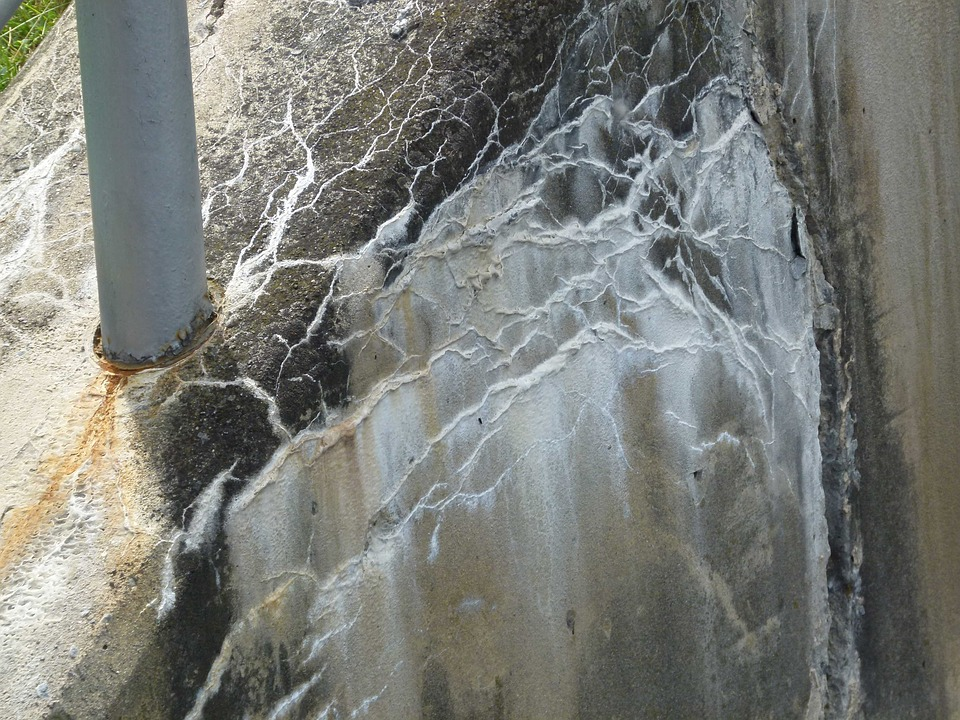
Leaching occurring in a cement wall due to natural weathering events.

== Leaching processes ==
There are many types of leaching scenarios; therefore, the extent of this topic is vast. In general, however, the three substances can be described as:

- a carrier, substance A;
- a solute, substance B;
- and a solvent, substance C.

Substance A and B are somewhat homogenous in a system prior to the introduction of substance C. At the beginning of the leaching process, substance C will work at dissolving the surficial substance B at a fairly high rate. The rate of dissolution will decrease substantially once it needs to penetrate through the pores of substance A in order to continue targeting substance B. This penetration can often lead to dissolution of substance A, or the product of more than one solute, both unsatisfactory if specific leaching is desired. The physiochemical and biological properties of the carrier and solute should be considered when observing the leaching process, and certain properties may be more important depending on the material, the solvent, and their availability. These specific properties can include, but are not limited to:

- Particle size
- Solvent
- Temperature
- Agitation
- Surface area
- Homogeneity of the carrier and solute
- Microorganism activity
- Mineralogy
- Intermediate products
- Crystal structure

The general process is typically broken up and summarized into three parts:

1. Dissolution of surficial solute by solvent
2. Diffusion of inner-solute through the pores of the carrier to reach the solvent
3. Transfer of dissolved solute out of the system

=== Leaching processes for biological substances ===
Biological substances can experience leaching themselves, as well as be used for leaching as part of the solvent substance to recover heavy metals. Many plants experience leaching of phenolics, carbohydrates, and amino acids, and can experience as much as 30% mass loss from leaching, just from sources of water such as rain, dew, mist, and fog. These sources of water would be considered the solvent in the leaching process and can also lead to the leaching of organic nutrients from plants such as free sugars, pectic substances, and sugar alcohols. This can in turn lead to more diversity in plant species that may experience a more direct access to water. This type of leaching can often lead to the removal of an undesirable component from the solid by water, this process is called washing. A major concern for leaching of plants, is if pesticides are leached and carried through stormwater runoff,; this is not only necessary to plant health, but it is important to control because pesticides can be toxic to human and animal health.

Bioleaching is a term that describes the removal of metal cations from insoluble ores by biological oxidation and complexation processes. This process is done in most part to extract copper, cobalt, nickel, zinc, and uranium from insoluble sulfides or oxides. Bioleaching processes can also be used in the re-use of fly ash by recovering aluminum using sulfuric acid.

=== Leaching processes for fly ash ===
Coal fly ash is a product that experiences heavy amounts of leaching during disposal. Though the re-use of fly ash in other materials such as concrete and bricks is encouraged, still much of it in the United States is disposed of in holding ponds, lagoons, landfills, and slag heaps. These disposal sites all contain water where washing effects can cause leaching of many different major elements, depending on the type of fly ash and the location where it originated. The leaching of fly ash is only concerning if the fly ash has not been disposed of properly, such as in the case of the Kingston Fossil Plant in Roane County, Tennessee. The Tennessee Valley Authority Kingston Fossil Plant structural failure lead to massive destruction throughout the area and serious levels of contamination downstream to both Emory River and Clinch River.

=== Leaching processes in soil ===
Leaching in soil is highly dependent on the characteristics of the soil, which makes modeling efforts difficult. Most leaching comes from infiltration of water, a washing effect much like that described for the leaching process of biological substances. The leaching is typically described by solute transport models, such as Darcy's Law, mass flow expressions, and diffusion-dispersion understandings. Leaching is controlled largely by the hydraulic conductivity of the soil, which is dependent on particle size and relative density that the soil has been consolidated to via stress. Diffusion is controlled by other factors such as pore size and soil skeleton, tortuosity of flow path, and distribution of the solvent (water) and solutes.

=== Leaching for mineral extraction ===
Leaching can sometimes be used to extract valuable materials from a wastewater product/ raw materials. In the field of mineralogy, acid leaching is common to extract Metals such as vanadium, Cobalt, Nickel, Manganese, Iron etc. from raw materials/ reused materials. In recent years, there has been more attention given to metal leaching to recover precious metals from waste materials. For example, the extraction of valuable metals from wastewater.

== Leaching mechanisms ==
Due to the assortment of leaching processes there are many variations in the data to be collected through laboratory methods and modeling, making it hard to interpret the data itself. Not only is the specified leaching process important, but also the focus of the experimentation itself. For instance, the focus could be directed toward mechanisms causing leaching, mineralogy as a group or individually, or the solvent that causes leaching. Most tests are done by evaluating mass loss due to a reagent, heat, or simply washing with water. A summary of various leaching processes and their respective laboratory tests can be viewed in the following table:

Table 1: Laboratory Tests for Various Leaching Processes
| Leaching process | Laboratory tests |
|---|---|
| Waste Leachate Removal | Batch Test or Column Test |
| Leaching from Plants | t-test or permutation test |
| Mobilization of Metal Cations | Bioleaching |
| Leaching Fly Ash | Evaporation from Disposal Pond |
| Cellular Extraction | Light Petroleum Fractions, Trichlorethylene Solvent, or Acetone/Ether Solvent |
| Coarse Solids Leaching | Batch Plant |
| Fine Solids Leaching | Agitation by Mechanical Stirrer or Compressed Air |

== Environmentally friendly leaching ==
Some recent work has been done to see if organic acids can be used to leach lithium and cobalt from spent batteries with some success. Experiments performed with varying temperatures and concentrations of malic acid show that the optimal conditions are 2.0 m/L of organic acid at a temperature of 90 °C. The reaction had an overall efficiency exceeding 90% with no harmful byproducts.

4 LiCoO_{2}(solid) + 12 C_{4}H_{6}O_{5}(liquid) → 4 LiC_{4}H_{5}O_{5}(liquid) + 4 Co(C_{4}H_{6}O_{5})_{2}(liquid) + 6 H_{2}O(liquid) + O_{2}(gas)

The same analysis with citric acid showed similar results with an optimal temperature and concentration of 90 °C and 1.5 molar solution of citric acid.

== See also ==
- Extraction
- Leachate
- Parboiling
- Surfactant leaching
- Sorption
- Weathering
