= Surfactant leaching =

Leaching of water-soluble paint components when wet

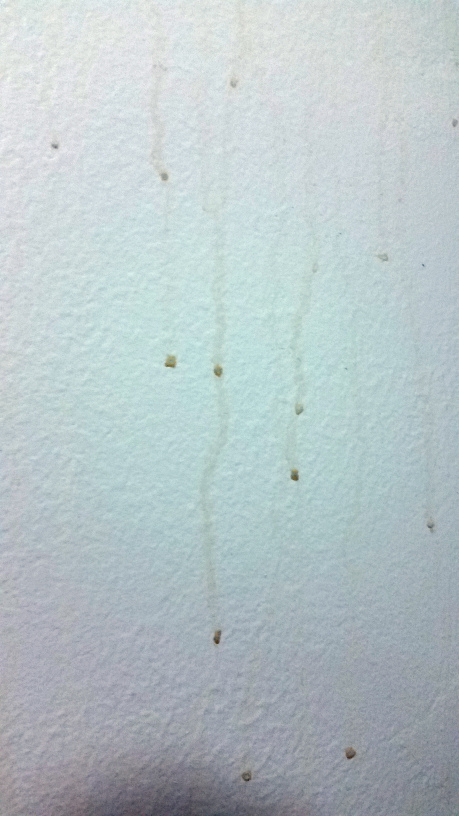
Latex-painted bathroom wall leaching surfactants, following water vapor condensation.

Surfactant leaching of acrylic (latex) paints, also known as exudate staining, streak staining, streaking, weeping, exudation, etc., occurs when the freshly painted surface becomes wet and water-soluble components of the paint (dispersants, surfactants, thickeners, glycols, etc.) leach out of the paint in sticky brown streaks. This may happen, e.g., due to rain or dew for exterior surfaces, or water vapor condensation on interior ones. On the external surfaces the streaks will normally weather off in several weeks, and removal of them before that time is impractical, especially because it may damage the paint before it is completely cured. The streaking phenomenon may also be observed for some silicone sealants.

The leaching effect should be taken into an account by manufacturers when formulating latex paints. A common approach is replacing water-soluble ingredients with volatile organic compounds (VOCs), which are not environmentally safe.

== See also ==
- Exudate
