= Hounsfield scale =

Quantitative scale of radiodensity

The Hounsfield scale (/ˈhaʊnzfiːld/ HOWNZ-feeld), named after Sir Godfrey Hounsfield, is a quantitative scale for describing radiodensity. It is frequently used in CT scans, where its value is also termed CT number.

== Definition ==
The Hounsfield unit (HU) scale is a linear transformation of the original linear attenuation coefficient measurement into one in which the radiodensity of distilled water at standard pressure and temperature (STP) is defined as 0 Hounsfield units (HU), while the radiodensity of air at STP is defined as −1000 HU. In a voxel with average linear attenuation coefficient $\mu$, the corresponding HU value is therefore given by:

$$HU = 1000\times\frac{\mu - \mu_{\textrm{water}}}{\mu_{\textrm{water}} - \mu_{\textrm{air}}}$$

where $\mu_{\textrm{water}}$ and $\mu_{\textrm{air}}$ are respectively the linear attenuation coefficients of water and air.

Thus, a change of one Hounsfield unit (HU) represents a change of 0.1% of the attenuation coefficient of water since the attenuation coefficient of air is nearly zero.

Calibration tests of HU with reference to water and other materials may be done to ensure standardised response. This is particularly important for CT scans used in radiotherapy treatment planning, where HU is converted to electron density. Variation in the measured values of reference materials with known composition, and variation between and within slices may be used as part of test procedures.

=== Rationale ===
The above standards were chosen originally to encode the radiodensity of organic tissues relative to water for 12-bit processing on clinical CT scanners. A 12-bit encoding corresponds to 4096 ($2^{12}$) values, where the range (–1024 to 3071) encompasses HU values for air, soft tissue and bone.

== Values for different body tissues and material ==
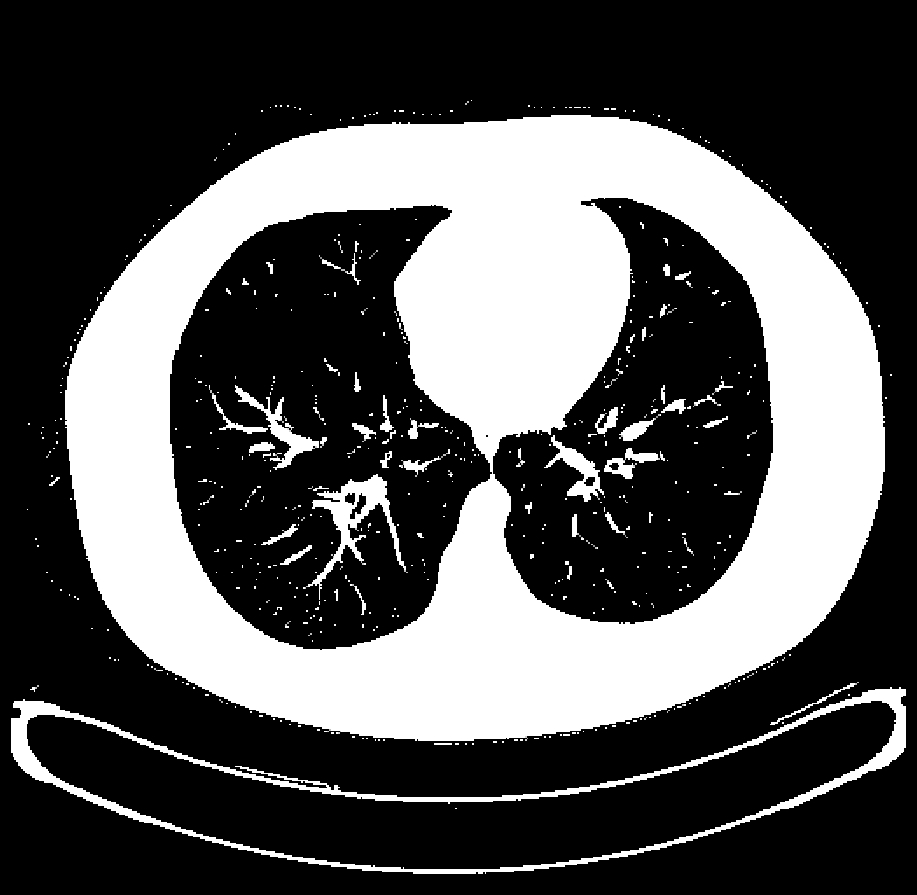
CT scan of the thorax with window level set to -700 HU (lung)

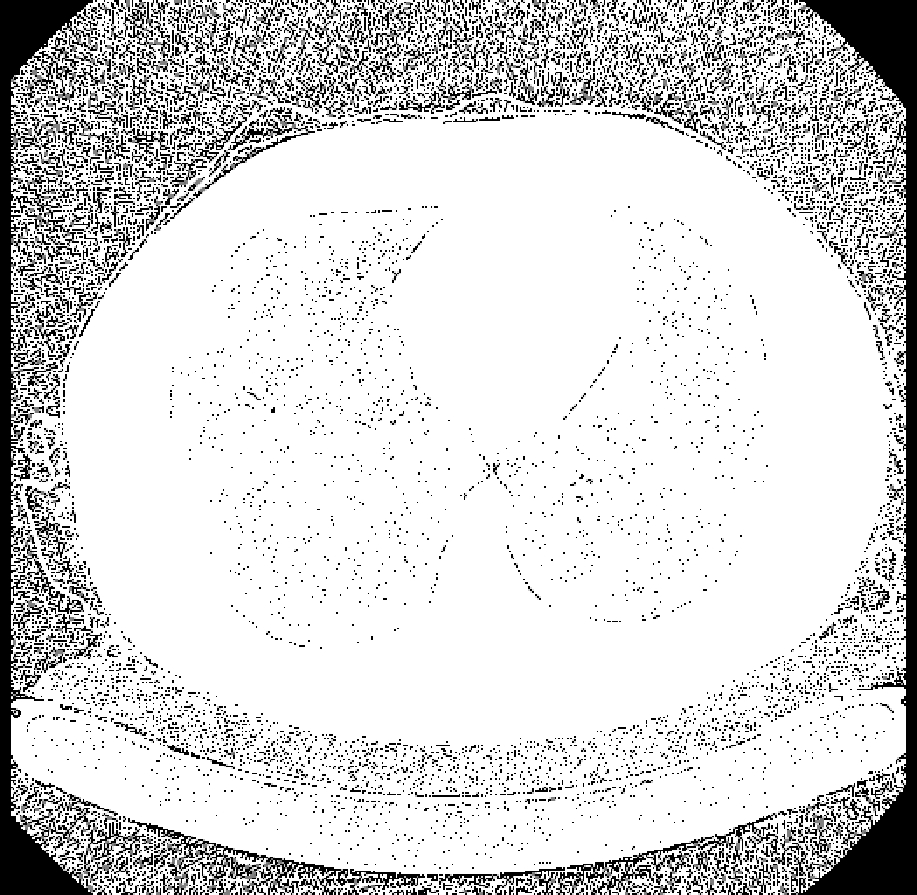
CT scan of the thorax with window level set to -1,000 HU (air)

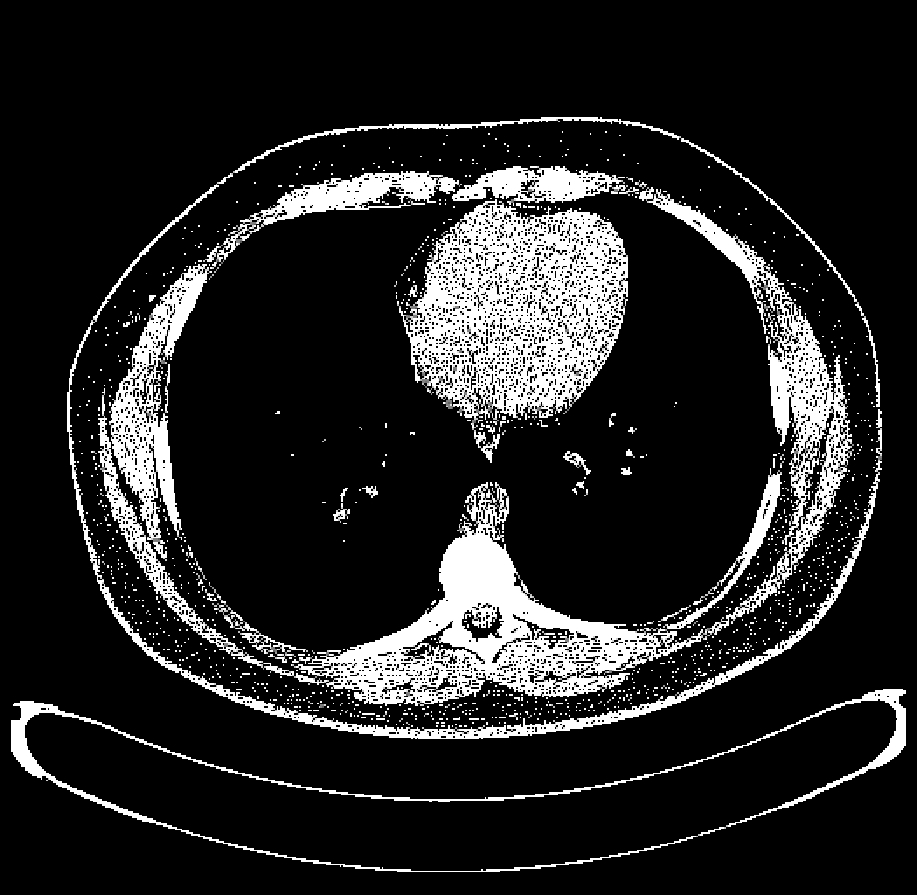
CT scan of the thorax with window level set to 0 HU (water)

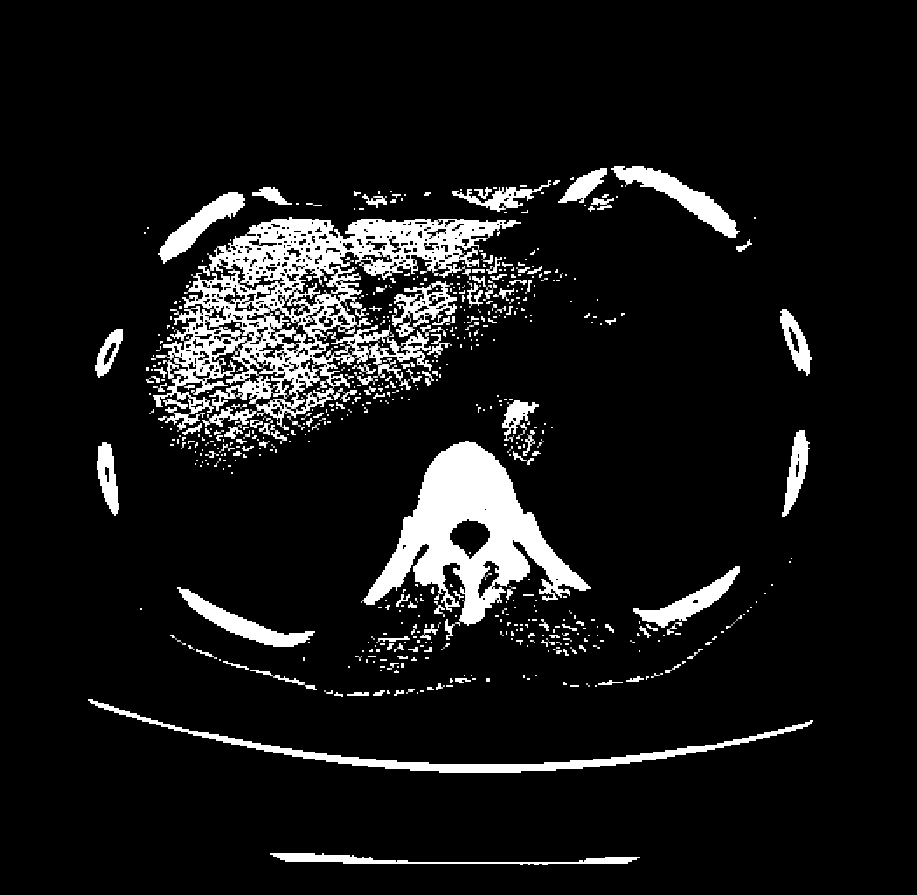
CT scan of the thorax with window level set to 60 HU (liver)

HU-based differentiation of material applies to medical-grade dual-energy CT scans but not to cone beam computed tomography (CBCT) scans, as CBCT scans provide unreliable HU readings.

Values reported here are approximations. Different dynamics are reported from one study to another.

Exact HU dynamics can vary from one CT acquisition to another due to CT acquisition and reconstruction parameters (kV, filters, reconstruction algorithms, etc.). The use of contrast agents modifies HU as well in some body parts (mainly blood).

Substance		HU
Air		−1000
Fat		−120 to −90
Soft tissue on contrast CT		+100 to +300
Bone	Cancellous	+300 to +400
Bone	Cortical	+500 to +1900
Subdural hematoma	First hours	+75 to +100
Subdural hematoma	After 3 days	+65 to +85
Subdural hematoma	After 10–14 days	+35 to +40
Other blood	Unclotted	+13 to +50
Other blood	Clotted	+50 to +75
Pleural effusion	Transudate	+2 to +15
Pleural effusion	Exudate	+4 to +33
Other fluids	Chyle	−30
Other fluids	Water	0
Other fluids	Urine	−5 to +15
Other fluids	Bile	−5 to +15
Other fluids	CSF	+15
Other fluids	Abscess / Pus	0 or +20, to +40 or +45
Other fluids	Mucus	0 - 130 ("high attenuating" at over 70 HU)
Parenchyma	Lung	−700 to −600
Parenchyma	Kidney	+20 to +45
Parenchyma	Liver	60 ± 6
Parenchyma	Lymph nodes	+10 to +20
Parenchyma	Muscle	+35 to +55
Parenchyma	Thymus	+20 to +40 in children; +20 to +120 in adolescents
Parenchyma	White matter	+20 to +30
Parenchyma	Grey matter	+37 to +45
Gallstone	Cholesterol stone	+30 to +100
Gallstone	Bilirubin stone	+90 to +120
Foreign body	Windowpane glass	+500
Foreign body	Aluminum, tarmac, car window glass, bottle glass, and other rocks	+2,100 to +2,300
Foreign body	Limestone	+2,800
Foreign body	Copper	+14,000
Foreign body	Silver	+17,000
Foreign body	Steel	+20,000
Foreign body	Gold, steel, and brass	+30,000 (upper measurable limit)
Earwax		<0

A practical application of this is in evaluation of tumors, where, for example, an adrenal tumor with a radiodensity of less than 10 HU is rather fatty in composition and almost certainly a benign adrenal adenoma.

== See also ==
- Cone beam computed tomography: Bone density and the Hounsfield scale.
