= Rivalta test =

Fluid test determining blood vessels

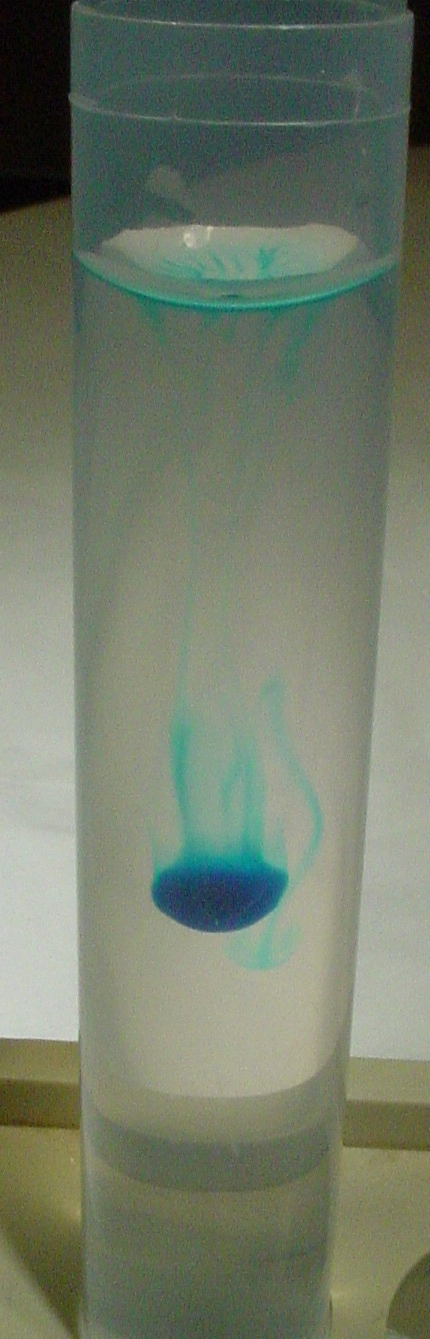
Positive Rivalta test of a FIP-Aspiration. For visualisation the fluid was colored by Methylenic blue.

Certain diseases can cause excessive accumulations of fluid in areas of the body such as the abdomen (ascites), the pleural space around the lungs (pleural effusion), or the pericardial space around the heart. An estimate of the concentration of protein in such fluids can narrow the differential diagnosis and assist the clinician in establishing a diagnosis. For example, fluid accumulations due to congestive heart failure and liver failure (cirrhosis) are typically lower in protein content and are called transudates, whereas fluid accumulations due to cancer and tuberculosis are typically higher in protein content and are called exudates. The Rivalta Test is a simple, inexpensive method that can be used in resource-limited settings to differentiate a transudate from an exudate. It is a simple, inexpensive method that does not require special laboratory equipment and can be easily performed in private practice. The test was originally developed by the Italian researcher Rivalta around 1900 and was used to differentiate transudates and exudates in human patients. It is also useful in cats to differentiate between effusions due to feline infectious peritonitis (FIP) and effusions caused by other diseases. Not only the high protein content but also high concentrations of fibrinogen and inflammatory mediators lead to a positive reaction.

== Method ==
A test tube is filled with distilled water and acetic acid is added. To this mixture one drop of the effusion to be tested is added. If the drop dissipates, the test is negative, indicating a transudate. If the drop precipitates, the test is positive, indicating an exudate.

Using a pH 4.0 acetic acid solution, 8 types of proteins were identified in Rivalta reaction-positive turbid precipitates: C-reactive protein (CRP), Alpha 1-antitrypsin (alpha1-AT), Orosomucoid ((Alpha-1-acid glycoprotein or AGP)), haptoglobin (Hp), transferrin (Tf), ceruloplasmin (Cp), fibrinogen (Fg), and hemopexin (Hpx). Since those are Acute-phase proteins, a positive Rivalta's test may be suggestive of inflammation.

== Procedure ==
To perform this test, a transparent reagent tube (volume 10 ml) is filled with approximately 7–8 ml distilled water, to which 1 drop of acetic acid (8%, plain white vinegar) is added and mixed thoroughly. On the surface of this solution, 1 drop of the effusion fluid is carefully layered. If the drop disappears and the solution remains clear, the Rivalta's test is defined as negative. If the drop retains its shape, stays attached to the surface or slowly floats down to the bottom of the tube (drop- or jelly-fish-like), the Rivalta's test is defined as positive.

The Rivalta's test had a high positive predictive value (86%) and a very high negative predictive value for FIP (96%) in a study in which cats that presented with effusion were investigated (prevalence of FIP 51%). Positive Rivalta's test results can occur in cats with bacterial peritonitis or lymphoma.
