= Tetraketopiperazine =

Names
- Preferred IUPAC name Piperazinetetrone
- Other names 2,3,5,6-Piperazinetetrone

Identifiers
CAS Number	49715-78-8
3D model (JSmol)	Interactive image
ChemSpider	245865
PubChem CID	279250
UNII	3RT8Z7D4Q8
CompTox Dashboard (EPA)	DTXSID10964366
- InChI: InChI=1S/C4H2N2O4/c7-1-2(8)6-4(10)3(9)5-1/h(H,5,7,9)(H,6,8,10) Key: IXRCBQCSNZKFHS-UHFFFAOYSA-N
- SMILES: C1(=O)C(=O)NC(=O)C(=O)N1

Properties
Chemical formula	C_{4}H_{2}N_{2}O_{4}
Molar mass	142.070 g·mol^{−1}
- Except where otherwise noted, data are given for materials in their standard state (at 25 °C [77 °F], 100 kPa). Infobox references

Tetraketopiperazine is a chemical compound with a molecule containing a six member heterocyclic ring with two nitrogen atoms. Each carbon is doubly bonded to oxygen.

== Production ==
Reacting sodium oxamate (the sodium salt of oxamic acid) with hydrochloric acid yields some tetraketopiperazine. A higher yield results from reacting ethyl oxamate with sodium ethoxide. Yet another way to make tetraketopiperazine is a condensation of oxamide with ethyl oxalate with sodium ethoxide present.

Excessive nitration of 2,6-diaminopyrazine ends up with tetraketopiperazine.

== Reactions ==
The nitrogen atoms in tetraketopiperazine are slightly acidic losing their hydrogen atoms as ions. Salts of tetraketopiperazine exist. Tetraketopiperazine reacts with sodium bicarbonate to yield a monosodium salt. A disodium salt results from reaction with sodium hydroxide or sodium alkoxide. These are likely to be tautomeric with a hydrogen moving to an oxygen atom. Potassium salts also exist. A monosilver salt can be made from a silver compound and a dissolved tetraketopiperazine potassium salt. Ammonia and mercury salts of tetraketopiperazine also exist. Tetraketopiperazine also can form a monohydrazone.

Reduction of tetraketopiperazine yields trikeopiperazine and then 2,5-diketopiperazine. Glyoxalic acid and oxamide are side products.

== Properties ==
When heated tetraketopiperazine does not melt, but turns black at 250°C.

Tetraketopiperazine is slightly soluble in water and more so in boiling acetic acid. The solid form has monoclinic prismatic crystals.

pK_{a} is 4.8 and the second pK_{a2} is 8.2.
