= D-lactate dehydrogenase =

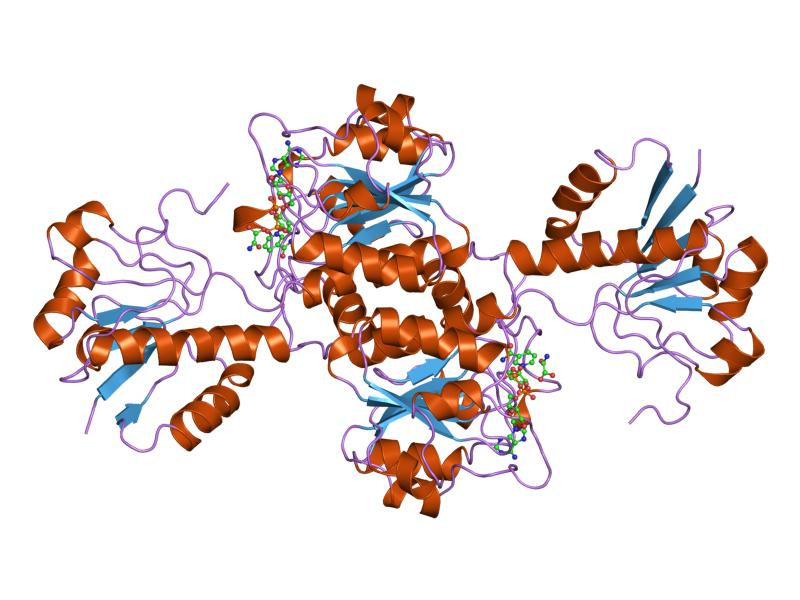
- D-LDH from Lactobacillus helveticus (PDB: 2DLD)

Identifiers
- EC no.: 1.1.1.28
- CAS no.: 9028-36-8

Databases
- BRENDA: enzyme data
- ExPASy: NiceZyme view
- KEGG: enzyme entry
- MetaCyc: metabolic pathway
- Rhea: reactions
- PDB structures: RCSB PDB PDBe PDBsum
Search
- PMC: articles
- PubMed: articles
- NCBI: proteins

A D-lactate dehydrogenase is a type of enzyme that converts D-lactate into pyruvate, and vice versa. Depending on the enzyme this can use the cofactor NAD(H) (EC 1.1.1.28) or FAD(H_{2}) (Rhea:82479). The FAD form is found in humans (LDHD), while the NAD(H) form is found in bacteria, plants, and fungi. The latter has systematic name (R)-lactate:NAD+ oxidoreductase, and catalyses the following chemical reaction

(R)-lactic acid
+ NAD^{+}
H^{+}
H^{+}
pyruvic acid
+ NADH

== Nomenclature ==
This enzyme has also been referred to as lactic acid dehydrogenase (ambiguous), D-specific lactic dehydrogenase, D-(-)-lactate dehydrogenase (NAD+), D-lactic acid dehydrogenase, and D-lactic dehydrogenase.
