= Oxamate =

Salt of oxamic acid

Names
- Other names Carbamoylformate; amino(oxo)acetate; 2-oxo-2-aminoacetate

Identifiers
CAS Number	598-90-3
3D model (JSmol)	Interactive image
Beilstein Reference	3903880
ChEBI	CHEBI:58363
ChemSpider	2285344
Gmelin Reference	217631
PubChem CID	3017661
- InChI: InChI=1S/C2H3NO3/c3-1(4)2(5)6/h(H2,3,4)(H,5,6)/p-1 Key: SOWBFZRMHSNYGE-UHFFFAOYSA-M
- SMILES: C(=O)(C(=O)[O-])N

Properties
Chemical formula	C_{2}H_{2}NO_{3}^{−}
Molar mass	88.043 g·mol^{−1}
- Except where otherwise noted, data are given for materials in their standard state (at 25 °C [77 °F], 100 kPa). Infobox references

Oxamate is the carboxylate anion of oxamic acid. Oxamate has a molecular formula of C_{2}H_{2}NO_{3}^{−} and is an isosteric form of pyruvate. Salts and esters of oxamic acid are known collectively as oxamates.

Oxamate is a competitive inhibitor of the enzyme lactate dehydrogenase. Oxamate is a possible pyruvate analog that has the ability to halt lactate production by inhibiting lactate dehydrogenase, effectively stopping the conversation process of pyruvate to lactate.

Oxamate, as a lactate dehydrogenase (LDH) inhibitor, plus phenformin, an anti-diabetic agent, has been tested in conjunction with one another and it was shown that this combination has potential anti-cancer properties. Phenformin when administered by itself has a high incidence of lactic acidosis. Due to the inherent ability of oxamate to prevent the conversion of pyruvate to lactate, oxamate can be used to counterbalance the side effects of phenformin.

Oxamate also plays inhibiting roles with oxaloacetate, an important intermediate for the citric acid cycle. Oxamate competes and binds to the carboxyl transferase domain active site, and reverses the reaction of oxalaoacetate decarboxylation by pyruvate carboxylase.
