= NAD(P) =

In biochemistry, NAD(P) may refer to:

- NAD, nicotinamide adenine dinucleotide
- NADP, nicotinamide adenine dinucleotide phosphate
