= D-lactate dehydrogenase (cytochrome) =

Class of enzymes

Identifiers
- EC no.: 1.1.2.4
- CAS no.: 37250-79-6

Databases
- BRENDA: enzyme data
- ExPASy: NiceZyme view
- KEGG: enzyme entry
- MetaCyc: metabolic pathway
- Rhea: reactions
- PDB structures: RCSB PDB PDBe PDBsum
- Gene Ontology: AmiGO / QuickGO
Search
- PMC: articles
- PubMed: articles
- NCBI: proteins

D-lactate dehydrogenases (cytochrome) (EC 1.1.2.4) are a type of enzyme found in yeast and plants that catalyze the chemical reaction

(R)-lactic acid
Fe^{3+}
Fe^{2+}
Fe^{3+}
Fe^{2+}
pyruvic acid
+ 2 H^{+}

The substrate of this enzyme is (R)-lactic acid, which is acted on by two equivalents of the cofactor, ferricytochrome c, which oxidises the hydroxy group to a keto group, giving pyruvic acid, while the cofactor's iron is reduced.

This enzyme belongs to the family of oxidoreductases, specifically those acting on the CH-OH group of donor with a cytochrome as acceptor. The systematic name of this enzyme class is (D)-lactate:ferricytochrome-c 2-oxidoreductase. Other names in common use include lactic acid dehydrogenase, D-lactate (cytochrome) dehydrogenase, cytochrome-dependent D-(−)-lactate dehydrogenase, D-lactate-cytochrome c reductase, and D-(−)-lactic cytochrome c reductase. This enzyme participates in pyruvate metabolism. It is a flavoprotein. This type of enzyme has been characterized in animals, fungi, bacteria and plants. It is believed to be important in the detoxification of methylglyoxal through the glyoxylase pathway.

== See also ==
- L-lactate dehydrogenase (cytochrome) which acts on the enantiomer of the substrate
