= Oxamic acid =

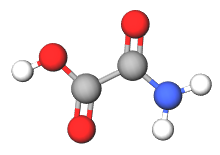
- Ball and stick model of oxamic acid

Names
- Preferred IUPAC name Oxamic acid
- Other names Amino(oxo)acetic acid 2-Amino-2-oxoacetic acid 2-oxoglycine Aminooxoacetic acid Oxalamic acid Oxamidic acid 2-Amino-2-oxoethanoic acid

Identifiers
CAS Number	471-47-6
3D model (JSmol)	Interactive image
ChEBI	CHEBI:18058
ChEMBL	ChEMBL15976
ChemSpider	949
DrugBank	DB03940
ECHA InfoCard	100.006.768
EC Number	207-443-0
KEGG	C01444
PubChem CID	974
UNII	QU60N5OPLG
CompTox Dashboard (EPA)	DTXSID6060052
- InChI: InChI=1S/C2H3NO3/c3-1(4)2(5)6/h(H2,3,4)(H,5,6) Key: SOWBFZRMHSNYGE-UHFFFAOYSA-N
- SMILES: C(=O)(C(=O)O)N

Properties
Chemical formula	NH_{2}C(O)COOH
Molar mass	89.050 g·mol^{−1}
Appearance	White solid
Melting point	209 °C
Solubility in water	Soluble
Acidity (pK_{a})	1.8

Hazards
- GHS labelling
Pictograms	(GHS07: Exclamation mark)
Signal word	Warning
Hazard statements	H315, H319, H335
Precautionary statements	P261, P264, P264+P265, P271, P280, P302+P352, P304+P340, P305+P351+P338, P319, P321, P332+P317, P337+P317, P362+P364, P403+P233, P405, P501
- Except where otherwise noted, data are given for materials in their standard state (at 25 °C [77 °F], 100 kPa). Infobox references

Oxamic acid is an organic compound with the formula NH_{2}C(O)COOH. It is a white, water-soluble solid. It is the monoamide of oxalic acid. Oxamic acid inhibits lactate dehydrogenase A. The active site of lactate dehydrogenase (LDH) is closed off once oxamic acid attaches to the LDH-NADH complex, effectively inhibiting it.

Oxamic acid also has applications in polymer chemistry. It increases the water solubility of certain polymers, including polyester, epoxide, and acrylic upon binding with them.

== See also ==
- Oxamate, the conjugate base of oxamic acid
