= Oxaluric acid =

Organic compound

- Skeletal formula of oxaluric acid

Names
- Preferred IUPAC name 2-(carbamoylamino)-2-oxoacetic acid

Identifiers
CAS Number	585-05-7
3D model (JSmol)	Interactive image
ChEBI	CHEBI:16582
ChEMBL	ChEMBL899896
ChemSpider	443
KEGG	C00802
PubChem CID	456
CompTox Dashboard (EPA)	DTXSID00207214
- InChI: InChI=1S/C3H4N2O4/c4-3(9)5-1(6)2(7)8/h(H,7,8)(H3,4,5,6,9) Key: UWBHMRBRLOJJAA-UHFFFAOYSA-N
- SMILES: C(=O)(C(=O)O)NC(=O)N
- Except where otherwise noted, data are given for materials in their standard state (at 25 °C [77 °F], 100 kPa). Infobox references

Oxaluric acid is an organic compound with the formula C_{3}H_{4}N_{2}O_{4}. It is a 2-oxo monocarboxylic acid that is amino(oxo)acetic acid with a nitrogen atom substituted by a carbamoylamino group. It is a urea.

== Occurrence ==
Oxaluric acid appears naturally in Escherichia coli as a metabolite, and has been reported in Apis cerana, Euglena gracilis, and Trypanosoma brucei. It is also found in the cocoa bean.

== Production and synthesis ==
Oxaluric acid is made in Escherichia coli in the allantoin degradation metabolic pathway, where (S)-ureidoglycolic acid and NADP react to make hydrogen, NADPH, and oxaluric acid. The chemical is also produced through the spontaneous degradation of parabanic acid in the yeast species Saccharomyces cerevisiae.

== Uses ==
Oxaluric acid is also used in allantoin degradation, where it and phosphate react to make carbamoyl phosphate and oxamate.
