= L-lactate dehydrogenase (cytochrome) =

Identifiers
- EC no.: 1.1.2.3
- CAS no.: 9078-32-4

Databases
- BRENDA: enzyme data
- ExPASy: NiceZyme view
- KEGG: enzyme entry
- MetaCyc: metabolic pathway
- Rhea: reactions
- PDB structures: RCSB PDB PDBe PDBsum
- Gene Ontology: AmiGO / QuickGO
Search
- PMC: articles
- PubMed: articles
- NCBI: proteins

L-lactate dehydrogenases (cytochrome) (EC number 1.1.2.3) are a type of enzyme found in yeast that catalyze the chemical reaction

lactic acid
Fe^{3+}
Fe^{2+}
Fe^{3+}
Fe^{2+}
pyruvic acid
+ 2 H^{+}

The substrate of this enzyme is (S)-lactic acid, which is acted on by two equivalents of the cofactor, ferricytochrome c, which oxidises the hydroxy group to a keto group, giving pyruvic acid, while the cofactor's iron is reduced.

== See also ==
- D-lactate dehydrogenase (cytochrome) which acts on the enantiomer of the substrate
