= LDHD =

Protein-coding gene in humans

Identifiers
- Aliases: LDHD, DLD, lactate dehydrogenase D, DLACD
- External IDs: OMIM: 607490; MGI: 106428; GeneCards: LDHD

Gene location (Human)
Chr.	Chromosome 16 (human)
Band	16q23.1	Start	75,111,860 bp
Band	16q23.1	End	75,116,780 bp

Gene location (Mouse)
Chr.	Chromosome 8 (mouse)
Band	8 E1|8 57.98 cM	Start	112,350,417 bp
Band	8 E1|8 57.98 cM	End	112,357,006 bp
RNA expression pattern
Bgee	Human / Mouse (ortholog); Top expressed in: apex of heart; right lobe of liver; mucosa of transverse colon; muscle of thigh; left ventricle; gastrocnemius muscle; right auricle of heart; testicle; body of stomach; right adrenal cortex / Top expressed in: right kidney; human kidney; left lobe of liver; interventricular septum; olfactory epithelium; proximal tubule; muscle of thigh; epithelium of stomach; gastrula; brown adipose tissue; More reference expression data
BioGPS	n/a
Gene ontology
Molecular function	oxidoreductase activity; D-lactate dehydrogenase (cytochrome) activity; protein binding; catalytic activity; flavin adenine dinucleotide binding; oxidoreductase activity, acting on CH-OH group of donors; FAD binding; D-lactate dehydrogenase activity
Cellular component	mitochondrial inner membrane; mitochondrion
Biological process	lactate catabolic process
Sources:Amigo / QuickGO
Orthologs
Databases	NCBI: entry; OMA: entry
Species	Human	Mouse
Entrez	197257	52815
Ensembl	ENSG00000166816	ENSMUSG00000031958
UniProt	Q86WU2	Q7TNG8
RefSeq (mRNA)	NM_194436; NM_153486	NM_027570
RefSeq (protein)	NP_705690; NP_919417	NP_081846
Location (UCSC)	Chr 16: 75.11 – 75.12 Mb	Chr 8: 112.35 – 112.36 Mb
PubMed search
- Wikidata
View/Edit Human	View/Edit Mouse

Lactate dehydrogenase D is a protein that in humans is encoded by the LDHD gene. Lactate dehydrogenase D is a mitochondrial oxidoreductase that participates in lactate catabolism.
