= Radiodensity =

Level of opacity to the radio wave and X-ray portion of the electromagnetic spectrum

Radiodensity (or radiopacity) refers to the degree of opacity to the radio wave and X-ray portion of the electromagnetic spectrum: that is, the relative inability of those kinds of electromagnetic radiation to pass through a particular material. Radiolucency or hypodensity indicates greater passage (greater transradiancy) to X-ray photons and is the analogue of transparency and translucency with visible light. Materials that inhibit the passage of electromagnetic radiation are called radiodense or radiopaque, while those that allow radiation to pass more freely are referred to as radiolucent. Radiopaque volumes of material have white appearance on radiographs, compared with the relatively darker appearance of radiolucent volumes. For example, on typical radiographs, bones look white or light gray (radiopaque), whereas muscle and skin look black or dark gray, being mostly invisible (radiolucent).

Though the term radiodensity is more commonly used in the context of qualitative comparison, radiodensity can also be quantified according to the Hounsfield scale, a principle which is central to X-ray computed tomography (CT scan) applications. On the Hounsfield scale, distilled water has a value of 0 Hounsfield units (HU), while air is specified as -1000 HU.

In modern medicine, radiodense substances are those that will not allow X-rays or similar radiation to pass. Radiographic imaging has been revolutionized by radiodense contrast media, which can be passed through the bloodstream, the gastrointestinal tract, or into the cerebral spinal fluid and utilized to highlight CT scan or X-ray images. Radiopacity is one of the key considerations in the design of various devices such as guidewires or stents that are used during radiological intervention. The radiopacity of a given endovascular device is important since it allows the device to be tracked during the interventional procedure. The two main factors contributing to a material's radiopacity are density and atomic number. Two common radiodense elements used in medical imagery are barium and iodine.

Medical devices often contain a radiopacifier to enhance visualization during implantation for temporary implantation devices, such as catheters or guidewires, or for monitoring the position of permanently implanted medical devices, such as stents, hip and knee implants, and screws. Metal implants usually have sufficient radiocontrast that additional radiopacifier is not necessary. Polymer-based devices, however, usually incorporate materials with high electron density contrast compared to the surrounding tissue. Examples of radiocontrast materials include titanium, tungsten, barium sulfate, bismuth oxide and zirconium oxide. Some solutions involve direct binding of heavy elements, for instance iodine, to polymeric chains in order to obtain a more homogeneous material which has lower interface criticalities. When testing a new medical device for regulatory submission, device manufacturers will usually evaluate the radiocontrast according to ASTM F640 "Standard Test Methods for Determining Radiopacity for Medical Use."

== See also ==
- Hounsfield scale
