= Lactate dehydrogenase B =

LDHB

Identifiers
- Aliases: LDHB, HEL-S-281, LDH-B, LDH-H, LDHBD, TRG-5, lactate dehydrogenase B
- External IDs: OMIM: 150100; MGI: 96763; GeneCards: LDHB
Available structures
PDB	Ortholog search: PDBe RCSB
PDB	List of PDB id codes 1I0Z, 1T2F
Enzyme activity
EC #	BRENDA	ExPASy	KEGG	MetaCyc
1.1.1.27	↗	↗	↗	↗

Gene location (Human)
Chr.	Chromosome 12 (human)
Band	12p12.1	Start	21,635,342 bp
Band	12p12.1	End	21,757,857 bp

Gene location (Mouse)
Chr.	Chromosome 6 (mouse)
Band	6 G2|6 74.17 cM	Start	142,435,975 bp
Band	6 G2|6 74.17 cM	End	142,453,683 bp
RNA expression pattern
Bgee	Human / Mouse (ortholog); Top expressed in: renal medulla; right ventricle; external globus pallidus; endothelial cell; lateral nuclear group of thalamus; myocardium of left ventricle; pars compacta; pars reticulata; kidney tubule; middle temporal gyrus / Top expressed in: primary oocyte; secondary oocyte; zygote; right kidney; right ventricle; primary visual cortex; superior frontal gyrus; vestibular membrane of cochlear duct; anterior horn of spinal cord; proximal tubule; More reference expression data
BioGPS	n/a
Gene ontology
Molecular function	oxidoreductase activity, acting on the CH-OH group of donors, NAD or NADP as acceptor; oxidoreductase activity; lactate dehydrogenase activity; protein binding; kinase binding; NAD binding; catalytic activity; L-lactate dehydrogenase activity; identical protein binding
Cellular component	extracellular exosome; membrane raft; membrane; myelin sheath; mitochondrion; cytoplasm; cytosol
Biological process	NAD metabolic process; lactate metabolic process; carboxylic acid metabolic process; pyruvate metabolic process; carbohydrate metabolic process
Sources:Amigo / QuickGO
Orthologs
Databases	NCBI: entry; OMA: entry
Species	Human	Mouse
Entrez	3945	16832
Ensembl	ENSG00000111716	ENSMUSG00000030246
UniProt	P07195	P16125
RefSeq (mRNA)	NM_001174097; NM_002300; NM_001315537	NM_008492; NM_001302765; NM_001316322
RefSeq (protein)	NP_001167568; NP_001302466; NP_002291	NP_001289694; NP_001303251; NP_032518
Location (UCSC)	Chr 12: 21.64 – 21.76 Mb	Chr 6: 142.44 – 142.45 Mb
PubMed search
- Wikidata
View/Edit Human	View/Edit Mouse

Lactate dehydrogenase B is a protein that in humans is encoded by the LDHB gene.

== Function ==
This gene encodes the B subunit of lactate dehydrogenase enzyme, which catalyzes the interconversion of pyruvate and lactate with concomitant interconversion of NADH and NAD+ in a post-glycolysis process. Alternatively spliced transcript variants have been found for this gene. Recent studies have shown that a C-terminally extended isoform is produced by use of an alternative in-frame translation termination codon via a stop codon readthrough mechanism, and that this isoform is localized in the peroxisomes. Mutations in this gene are associated with lactate dehydrogenase B deficiency. Pseudogenes have been identified on chromosomes X, 5 and 13.
