= Denis Browne Gold Medal =

British paediatric surgery award

Denis Browne Gold Medal is a medal that was first struck in 1968, one year after the death of the paediatric surgeon Denis Browne and is awarded for outstanding contributions to paediatric surgery worldwide and is an honour bestowed by The British Association of Paediatric Surgeons.

== Recipients ==
| Year | Name | Rationale | Notes |
|---|---|---|---|
| 1968 | Robert Gross | a pioneer in the field of paediatric cardiac surgery, for first successful operation for correction of Patent ductus arteriosus, for the first successful resection of coarctation of the aorta in 1945, for research that led to the use of preserved aortic homograft for the correction of long-segment coarctation of the aorta in 1948. | |
| 1969 | Max Grob | for being the father of paediatric surgery in Switzerland, one of the founders of the speciality of paediatric surgery in the German-speaking countries and for research into paediatric urology. | |
| 1970 | David James Waterston | For being a pioneer in the treatment of congenital trachea-oesophageal fistulas and opening a thoracic unit along with RE Bonham-Carter, where both medical and surgical diseases of the chest and heart were treated jointly, which was the first of its kind in the world | |
| 1971 | Charles Everett Koop | for establishing a world-renowned paediatric surgery training program, the founding editor of the "Journal of Paediatric Surgery" in 1964 and being appointed to serve the United States 13th Surgeon General and Director of the Office of International Health on 17 November 1981 and for writing an influential report “The Surgeon General’s Report on Smoking and Health”. | |
| 1972 | Peter Paul Rickham | for devising the Rickham reservoir, an integral part of the Holter ventricular drainage system for hydrocephalus and for establishing the first neonatal surgical unit in the world, that improved the survival of newborn infants undergoing surgery from 22 per cent to 74 per cent. | |
| 1973 | Matti Sulamaa | for establishing the first paediatric ICU in Finland in 1963 and for research into oesophageal atresia, for introducing the concept of application of metal struts for chest wall deformities and for developing the surgical treatment of thalidomide children. | |
| 1974 | Theodor Ehrenpreis | for extensive research into Hirschsprung’s disease | |
| 1975 | David Innes Williams | for being the founder of the modern medical field of paediatric urology. | |
| 1976 | Frank Douglas Stephens | for fundamental research into embryology and pathological development of anomalies of the urinary tract, especially ureteric reflux, dysplasias, duplications, ureterocoeles and urethral valves; of the genital tract, including cloacal and vaginal anomalies; and of the vast range of ano-rectal anomalies in which his work defined the detailed anatomy of each type. | |
| 1977 | Robert Bransby Zachary | for establishing Sheffield University as an important centre for children's surgery, for setting up the British Association of Paediatric Surgeons, for research into neuro-spinal disorders, including spina bifida, that led to a rise in quality of life for many children. | |
| 1978 | Fritz Rehbein | for research into severe malformations of the gastrointestinal tract, aortic stenosis, patent ductus arteriosus, and Blalock- Taussig anastomoses, for the first successful repair of esophageal atresia in Germany. For developing in 1953, the procedure for Hirschprung’s disease that bears his name and for founding in 1964 the "Zeitschtift fur Kinderchirurgie", now known as the "European Journal of Pediatric Surgery | |
| 1979 | Orvar Swenson | for discovering that Hirschsprung's disease was caused by an absence of ganglion cells in the rectum and for developing a treatment that became known as the "Swenson pull-through" and for restructuring of paediatric surgery departments, paediatric surgery research, and writing and editing multiple volumes of "Pediatric Surgery", the standard textbook for paediatric surgeons. | |
| 1980 | Jannie Hendrick Louw | founder of paediatric surgery in South Africa, instrumental in establishing the various surgical specialities as independent entities. | |
| 1981 | Andrew Wood Wilkinson | for being the first professor of paediatric surgery in the uk, for establishing a laboratory to research metabolism in children and for research into the role of trace elements | |
| 1982 | Harold Homewood Nixon | for research into anorectal malformations, Hirschsprung's disease and neonatal intestinal obstruction | |
| 1983 | Stephen L. Gans | for being the first paediatric surgeon to use the Hopkins Rod Lens System for endoscopy, for describing the use of a Fogarty catheter for treating H-type fistulas, for being one of the founders of the "Journal of Paediatric Surgery", for conducting minimally invasive surgery by doing laparoscopy in 1973, for being a major proponent for the creation of the Pacific Association of Pediatric Surgeons. | |
| 1984 | H. William Clatworthy | for research into surgical oncology, for co-development of the mesenteric-caval shunt for portal hypertension(Marion-Clatworthy shunt). | |
| 1985 | Russell Norfolk Howard | for research into oesophageal atresia and other thoracic procedures that covered a wide span of operative paediatrics and for establishing a new diploma in paediatric surgery at Australian Royal College. | |
| 1986 | Morio Kasai | for development of the Hepatoportoenterostomy, for biliary atresia in 1955, later known as the Kasai Procedure and for contributions in the areas of general pediatric surgery, neonatal surgery, pediatric surgical nutrition, and pediatric surgical oncology. | |
| 1987 | Ola Knutrud | for establishing Norway's first pediatric surgery department in 1962, as an important driving force in the work of mapping esophageal atresia in Norway and for separating a Siamese pair of twins grown together from the chest down to the feet (thoracopagus), that gained international attention. | |
| 1988 | Mark Mitchell Ravitch | for research into of chest-wall deformities, treatment of benign colon and rectal disease intussusception in children and as a pioneer in the use of mechanical suturing using Surgical staples that introduced minimally invasive surgery | |
| 1989 | Barry O'Donnell | for co-founding the Children’s Research Centre in 1965 at Our Lady’s Hospital for Sick Children, Dublin, for pioneering along with Prem Puri, the sub-ureteric Teflon injection (STING) procedure for Vesicoureteral reflux in 1984 | |
| 1990 | John Eric Somerville Scott | for establishing paediatric surgery units at the highest level at the Fleming Memorial Hospital, Royal Victoria Infirmary and Great North Children's Hospital in Newcastle upon Tyne | |
| 1991 | William Hardy Hendren | for research into the surgical correction of complex urogenital abnormalities, such as cloaca. | |
| 1992 | James Lister | for establishing an international reputation in neonatal surgery, where his observations provided new insights into the pathogenesis and management of many life-threatening congenital disorders, that resulted in a drop in mortality, from 30-40 per cent in the sixties, to less than 10 per cent. | |
| 1993 | Ramniklal K. Gandhi | | |
| 1994 | Jan Christoffel Molenaar | for establishing the first academic pediatric surgery unit at the VU University Medical Center and Vrije Universiteit Amsterdam and for becoming the first full Professor of Pediatric Surgery at Erasmus University in Rotterdam | |
| 1995 | J. Alex Haller | for establishing the "Johns Hopkins Children Center" that advanced the concept of the Children's Medical and Surgical Center, for establishing the Division of Pediatric Surgery in 1963, that implemented pediatric surgery as sub-speciality, for creating the PALS protocol, for developing the Haller Index | |
| 1996 | Edward Durham Smith | for popularized the two-stage hypospadias repair and writing a book on anorectal malformations with Douglas Stephens. | |
| 1997 | John David Atwell | for training paediatric surgeons, for developing a network of regional clinics held in every paediatric unit in the region [that] was to become the model for the rest of the country and for research into neonatal surgery. | |
| 1998 | Jay Lazar Grosfeld | for ensuring that paediatric surgical oncology and related research achieved world class status at Indiana University, for being a brilliant academic teacher that led to a world-class training program, for research into short bowel syndrome, biliary atresia, Wilms’ tumours and neuroblastoma and for being the longest serving editor of the “Journal of Pediatric Surgery” beginning in 1994. | |
| 1999 | Dan Greer Young | for research into congenital disorders, for the introduction of the first shunts to control hydrocephalus in newborns and babies born with spina bifida, for being an outstanding educator, role model and mentor and for being Glasgow University’s first professor of surgical paediatrics in 1992. | |
| 2000 | Jinzhe Zhang | for establishing paediatric surgery in China, becoming the father paediatric surgery in China, for the invention of more than fifty surgical instruments and for establishing paediatric anesthesiology in china. | |
| 2001 | Edward Howard | | |
| 2002 | JJ Corkery | | |
| 2003 | Leela Kapila | | |
| 2004 | Lewis Spitz | for championing the plight of those with cerebral palsy and other congenital disorders whose foregut and its function prejudiced their ability to eat; demonstrating that appropriate surgery could improve their quality of life and for management of and treatment of conjoined twins thereby becoming the foremost international opinion in this field. | |
| 2005 | David Lloyd | | |
| 2006 | Prem Puri | for research into common congenital birth defects, e.g. vesicoureteral reflux, Hirschsprung's disease and related disorders as well as congenital diaphragmatic hernia. | |
| 2007 | Arnold G Coran | for research into Hirschsprung disease, inflammatory bowel disease, fluid changes in infants receiving total parenteral nutrition, esophageal surgery in infants, parenteral and enteral nutrition, shock in children and bacterial translocation in the neonate | |
| 2008 | John Hutson | for establishing the F. D. Stephens Research Laboratory in 1984, for establishing urology department at the Royal Children's Hospital, Melbourne and for contributions to research. | |
| 2009 | Edward Kiely | for extensive research into Neuroblastoma and surgical separation of Conjoined twins. | |
| 2010 | Michael Hollwarth | for running the largest child trauma center in the German-speaking area over the past 15 years and significant contribution to the establishment of the European Society for Paediatric Surgery EUPSA (European Paediatric Surgeons' Association). He also enabled paediatric surgeons from the former Eastern Bloc countries to train at European paediatric surgical clinics | |
| 2011 | Alastair J W Millar | for outstanding contributions to paediatric surgery | |
| 2012 | Adrian Bianchi | for defining the surgical technique, Longitudinal Intestinal Lengthening and Tailoring, known as the Bianchi procedure. | |
| 2013 | Michael R. Harrison | for being the father of Fetal Surgery in America and establishing the first Fetal Treatment Center in the U.S, | |
| 2014 | Samuel Moore | for research into conditions affecting the Enteric nervous system and developmental aspects of cancer of childhood with a special interest in their genetics. | |
| 2015 | George Gray Youngson | for research into surgical education, research into human factors related to surgical performance, and service configuration for children's specialist care. | |
| 2016 | Risto Juhana Rintala | | |
| 2017 | Paul Tam | for research into minimally invasive surgery, genetics and regenerative medicine of birth defects such as Hirschsprung's disease and for playing a key role in bringing Karolinska Institutet, the academic home for the Nobel Prize in Physiology and Medicine, to establish its only footprint outside Sweden in Hong Kong. | |
| 2018 | Alberto Peña | for research into anorectal malformations, cloacal malformations and a variety of other congenital anomalies of the pelvis, abdominal wall and Hirschsprung's disease., for the transformation of colorectal treatment by introducing the posterior sagittal anorectoplasty, also known as the "Peña Pull-Through" procedure. | |
| 2019 | Patricia K. Donahoe | for research that focuses on the genetics of congenital diaphragmatic hernia, gender differentiation and the role of Müllerian Inhibiting Substance in development, oncogenesis, and oncoprotection. | |
| 2020 | | No medal was awarded in 2020. | |
| 2021 | David FM Thomas | | |
| 2022 | Dakshesh Parikh | for research into surgery involving the organs within the thoracic cavities, lung, heart and oesophagus and for pioneering a number of innovative techniques. | |
| 2023 | Azad S Najmaldin | for pioneering gastrointestinal, thoracic and urology endoscopic surgery beginning in 1992 and later robotic surgery in 2005 as well as founding two societies, the British Association of Paediatric Endoscopic Surgeons as well as the European Society of Paediatric Endoscopic Surgeons | |
| 2024 | Mark Davenport | for research into hepatobiliary conditions in particular Biliary atresia and choledochal malformations | |
