= Andrea Hayes-Jordan =

American pediatric surgeon

Andrea Hayes Dixon
- Born: 1965 (age 60–61); Los Angeles, California, US
- Spouse: Hugh Nichols Dixon Sr.

Academic background
- Education: BA, religion, 1987, Dartmouth College; MD, 1991, Geisel School of Medicine

Academic work
- Institutions: Howard University HospitalUNC School of Medicine; University of Texas MD Anderson Cancer Center

Andrea A. Hayes Dixon (born 1965) is an American surgeon. She was the first pediatric surgeon to perform a high-risk, life-saving procedure in children with a rare form of cancer and developed the first orthotropic xenograft model of metastatic Ewing's sarcoma. In 2002, she became the first African American female pediatric surgeon board-certified in the United States.

Dixon is the Chairwoman of Surgery at Howard University Hospital.

== Early life and education ==
Dixon was born in Los Angeles, California in 1965. She enrolled at Dartmouth College for a Bachelor of Arts degree in Religion but accepted an opportunity to work in a leukemia lab at the medical school. Dixon then enrolled at Geisel School of Medicine wanting to be a pediatrician but was inspired by Thomas Colacchio to shift her focus. While completing her sub-internship at Stanford University, she studied pediatric surgery and chose to pursue the profession as a career.

== Career ==
Upon graduating from medical school, Dixon decided to focus on pediatric surgery but was rejected three times from hospitals for their training programs. When her mentor asked why she was being rejected, one surgeon replied that bringing in the first black woman was too much of a risk for his program. As a result, Hayes-Jordan went to a training program in Toronto and in 2002, she became the first black, female, board-certified pediatric surgeon in the United States. She started working with children with cancer at St. Jude's Hospital before specifically focusing on abdomen cancer.

Six years later, Dixon developed the first orthotropic xenograft model of metastatic Ewing's sarcoma while simultaneously completing the first cytoreductive surgery and hyper-thermic intraperitoneal chemotherapy HIPEC for children with sarcomatosis. By 2006, Dixon became the first surgeon in the United States to successfully use hyperthermic intraperitoneal chemotherapy on a child. During the 12-hour operation, she removed all the tumors before pumping a chemotherapy drug heated to 103 degrees throughout the abdominal cavity.

=== UNC ===
In 2018, Dixon was appointed Chief of the Division of Pediatric Surgery at UNC School of Medicine and named Surgeon-in-Chief at the North Carolina Children's Hospital. While serving in this role, she was appointed by President Donald Trump to sit on the National Cancer Advisory Board, where she would advise and assist the National Cancer Institute Director on the activities of the National Cancer Program. On September 25, 2019, Hayes-Jordan was honored with the Byah Thomason Doxey-Sanford Doxey Distinguished Professorship.

During the COVID-19 pandemic in North America, Dixon was named to American Pediatric Surgical Association's board of directors and elected President of the Society of Black Academic Surgeons, replacing Martin Karpeh. She was also recognized by the Triangle Business Journal as one of its 2020 Health Care Heroes for her "outstanding accomplishments as a surgeon, teacher, and leader."

== Personal life ==
Dixon was married to former National Football League linebacker Darin Jordan; the couple had two children.She is now married to Philadelphia author Hugh Nichols Dixon Sr.

== Selected papers ==
- Emma C Hamilton; Thomas Curtin; Rebecca S Slack; Christine Ge; Austen D Slade; Andrea Hayes-Jordan; Kevin P Lally; Mary T Austin (2017). "Surgical Feeding Tubes in Pediatric and Adolescent Cancer Patients: A Single-institution Retrospective Review". Journal of Pediatric Hematology/Oncology. doi:10.1097/mph.0000000000000902. PMC 5610072. PMID 28678086. Wikidata Q38662651.
- David O Walterhouse; Alberto S Pappo; Jane L Meza; et al. (2017). "Reduction of cyclophosphamide dose for patients with subset 2 low-risk rhabdomyosarcoma is associated with an increased risk of recurrence: A report from the Soft Tissue Sarcoma Committee of the Children's Oncology Group". Cancer. 123 (12): 2368–2375. doi:10.1002/cncr.30613. PMC 5662934. PMID 28211936. Wikidata Q40330433.
- Carmen Lopez; Arlene Correa; Ara Vaporciyan; Mary Austin; David Rice; Andrea Hayes-Jordan (2016). "Outcomes of chest wall resections in pediatric sarcoma patients". Journal of Pediatric Surgery. 52 (1): 109–114. doi:10.1016/j.jpedsurg.2016.10.035. PMID 27914587. Wikidata Q39028317.
- Benjamin Freemyer; Emma Hamilton; Carla L Warneke; Ali M Ali; Cynthia Herzog; Andrea Hayes-Jordan; Mary Austin (2016). "Treatment outcomes in pediatric melanoma-Are there benefits to specialized care?". Journal of Pediatric Surgery. 51 (12): 2063–2067. doi:10.1016/j.jpedsurg.2016.09.039. PMID 27686483. Wikidata Q40560126.
- Andrea Hayes-Jordan; Michael P LaQuaglia; Shakeel Modak (2016). "Management of desmoplastic small round cell tumor". Seminars in pediatric surgery. 25 (5): 299–304. doi:10.1053/j.sempedsurg.2016.09.005. PMC 5614508. PMID 27955733. Wikidata Q39036554.
