= World Federation of Associations of Pediatric Surgeons =

International association for surgeons

- Abbreviation: WOFAPS
- Formation: 15 October 1974; 51 years ago
- Founded at: São Paulo, Brazil
- Headquarters: Bern, Switzerland
- Subsidiaries: WOFAPS Foundation
- Website: www.wofaps.org

World Federation of Associations of Pediatric Surgeons (WOFAPS) is an organisation established on 15 October 1974 in Brazil to promote the ethical study of pediatric research and to promote Pediatric Surgery as a distinct specialty of general surgery. The Kyoto Declaration of Pediatric Surgery, written in 2001, established the mission of the Federation to focus on the development and education of surgeons serving children, in all parts of the world.

== History ==
Several surgeons and associations supported the endorsement of the proposal for the "International Union of Pediatric Surgeons" proposed by Denys Pellerin in Paris in 1963. But the progress was slow. On 15 October 1974, WOFAPS was founded in São Paulo, Brazil, during a Pediatric Surgery Congress with representatives from 43 Countries under the Presidency of Prof. Virgilio Carvalho Pinto and Secretary General Prof. Jose Pinus. Harvey Beardmore from Canada was elected the first President of the WOFAPS. while Prof Jose "Pepe" Boix Ochoa was again re-elected as General Secretary (a post he would hold for 35 years!!).

Until 1983, only 23 associations belonged to the WOFAPS, but the organization has grown to include over 100 member countries today. It is recognized and participates in International Associations of Pediatric Surgery as a member as well as the International Pediatric Association, as well as other organizations such as UNICEF, UNESCO and WHO. This has been due to the past leadership and efforts of the members. Notable associations that have joined the WOFAPS include American Pediatric Surgical Association, EUPSA, the British Association of Paediatric Surgeons and the Deutsche Gesellschaft für Kinder- und Jugendchirurgie, as well as more geographically distributed associations, for example the Pan-African Paediatric Surgical Association.

The WOFAPS is a representation of Pediatric Surgical Associations and it does not represent any political ideas nor does it make any racial or religious distinction. The WOFAPS is governed by its Constitution and its official office is in Bern, Switzerland.

The WOFAPS Foundation is a subsidiary of WOFAPS that offers Scholarships to International Young Pediatric Surgeons from developing countries who have demonstrated strong interests in teaching and research. The WOFAPS foundation was headed by Prof. Prem Puri, previous president of WOFAPS and Lifetime Achievement Award recipient in 2013. Now the foundation is headed by Prof. Sameh Shehata, past president of WOFAPS.

=== Jose Boix Ochoa ===
During the WOFAPS 2025 in Antalya, Turkey inaugurated the first Jose Boix Ochoa Medal, which was awarded to Prof. Prem Puri for his extensive research in Pediatric Surgery.

=== World Pediatric Surgery Day ===
The World Pediatric Surgery (WPS) Day was established on April 7th by the WOFAPS and celebrated annually.

== WOFAPS presidents ==
- Harvey E. Beardmore (Canada) 1975–1977
- Denys Pellerin France) 1978–1980
- R.K. Gandhi (India) 1981–1983
- M. Bettex (Switzerland) 1984–1986
- Jose Ricardo Piñeiro (Argentina) 1987–1989
- K. Ashcraft (U.S.A.) 1990–1992
- W.A. Maier (Germany) 1993–1995
- Sid Cywes (South Africa) 1996–1998
- Jay Lazar Grosfeld (USA) 1999–2001
- T. Miyano (Japan) 2002–2004
- Arnold G. Coran (USA) 2005–2007
- Prem Puri (Ireland) 2008–2010
- Richard Azizkhan (USA) 2011–2013
- Devendra Gupta (India) 2014–2016
- David Sigalet (Canada) 2016–2019
- Sameh Shehata (Egypt) 2019–2022
- Alp Numanoglu (South Africa) 2022–2025
- Udo Rolle (Germany) 2026-2029

The board is currently led by Prof Udo Rolle (Germany) acting as president, Prof Shilpa Sharma (India) as general secretary and Prof Amadeo Zanotti (Paraguay) is the president elect for the current term (2026-2029). The WOFAPS executive board consists of 15 Pediatric Surgeons voting members representing all continents and one non voting member as Prof Mahmoud Elfiky (Egypt).

== WOFAPS meetings ==
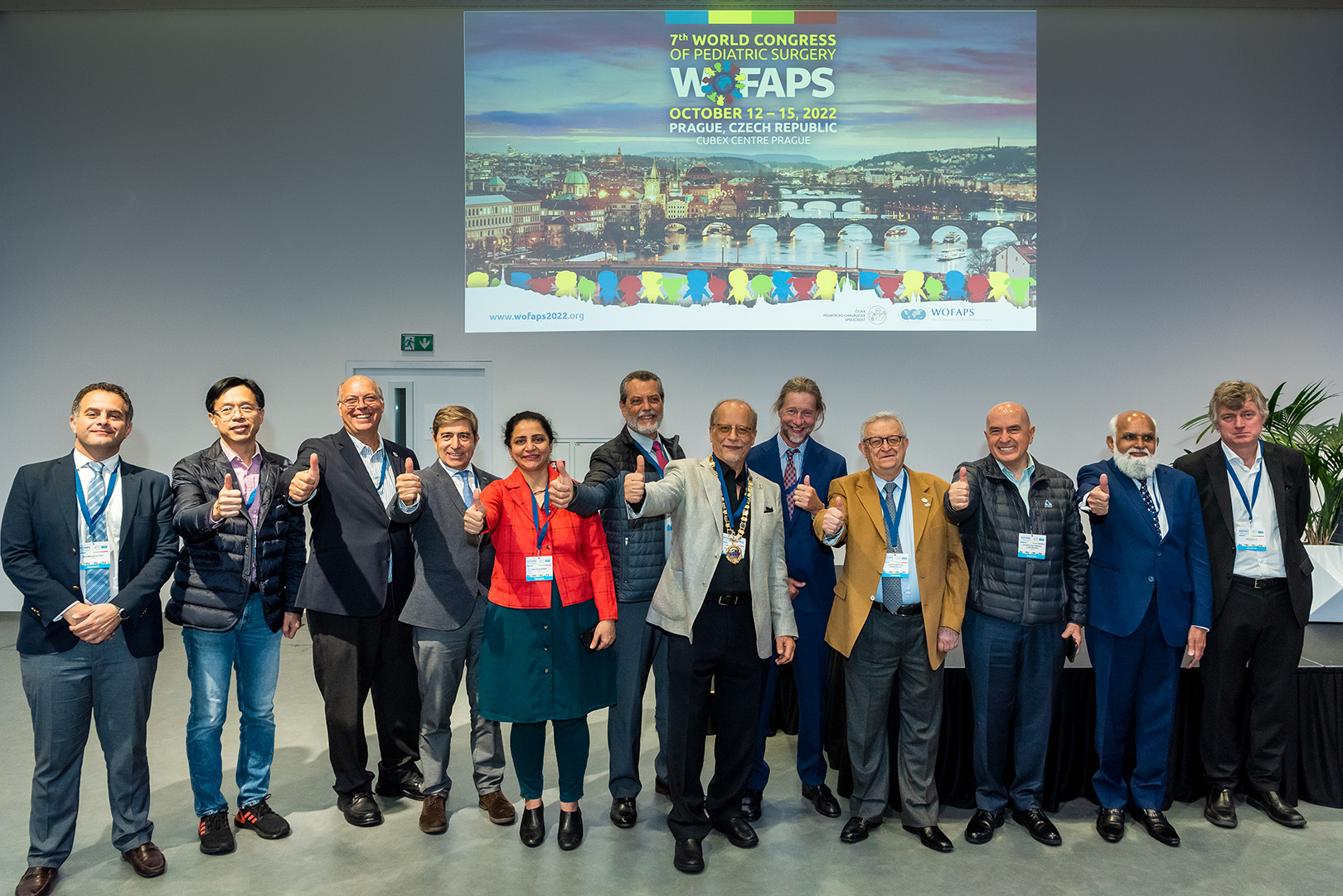
WOFAPS Executive Board in 2019–2022 at WOFAPS 7th Congress in Prague, Czech Republic

The WOFAPS World Congress is held every three years. However, the WOFAPS joins a regional meeting with another pediatric surgical association every year.

- 2004: Zagreb, Croatia
- 2007: Buenos Aires, Argentina
- 2010: Delhi, India
- 2013: Berlin, Germany
- 2016: Washington, D.C., United States
- 2019: Doha, Qatar
- 2022: Prague, Czech Republic
- 2025: Antalya, Turkey
- 2028: Bangkok, Thailand

== See also ==
- American Pediatric Surgical Association (APSA)
- British Association of Paediatric Surgeons (BAPS)
- Deutsche Gesellschaft für Kinder- und Jugendchirurgie (DGKCH)
- International Pediatric Endosurgery Group (IPEG)
- Pan-African Paediatric Surgical Association (PAPSA)
