= Morio Kasai =

Japanese pediatric surgeon (1922–2008)

- 葛西 森夫
- Born: September 29, 1922
- Died: December 8, 2008 (aged 86); Sendai, Miyagi Prefecture, Japan
- Known for: Kasai portoenterostomy
- Scientific career
- Fields: Surgery
- Institutions: Tohoku University

Morio Kasai (葛西 森夫; September 29, 1922 – December 8, 2008) was a Japanese surgeon who had a strong interest in pediatric surgery. While Kasai went into practice at a time when pediatric surgery was not an established subspecialty, much of his clinical and research work was related to the surgical care of children. He is best known for devising a surgical procedure, the hepatoportoenterostomy, to address a life-threatening birth defect known as biliary atresia. The modern form of the operation is still known as the Kasai procedure.

A graduate of the medical school at Tohoku University, Kasai remained there for most of his medical career, chairing the university's 2nd Department of Surgery and serving on the school's Board of Councilors. Though best known for the procedure that came to bear his name, Kasai also studied peritonitis in infants and children, and he made contributions to the understanding of esophageal cancer, pediatric liver cancer and a colon abnormality known as Hirschsprung's disease.

Kasai practiced from the 1940s until 1993, spending the last few years of his career leading a hospital in Tohoku. He suffered a debilitating stroke in 1999 and died in 2008.

== Early life and career ==
Kasai was born in Aomori Prefecture, located in the northernmost portion of the Japanese mainland. By junior high school, he lived in Hokkaido. He graduated from high school in Sendai and attended medical school there at Tohoku University. After training as a general surgeon, Kasai joined the Tohoku University faculty in the early 1950s. Kasai's early career interests included postoperative fluid and electrolyte management as well as the care of infants and children with peritonitis.

In 1959–60, Kasai spent nine months in the United States completing a pediatric surgical fellowship under C. Everett Koop at Children's Hospital of Philadelphia (CHOP). By 1960, Kasai had attained the rank of associate professor at Tohoku. Three years later, he became a full professor and department chair.

== Surgical contributions ==
=== The Kasai procedure ===
Kasai and a colleague, Sozo Suzuki, worked together in the 1950s to devise a surgery to treat babies born with biliary atresia, a typically fatal condition of the gastrointestinal tract. While American surgeon William E. Ladd had first described surgery for the condition in the 1920s, the widely held belief was that only a small percentage of cases could be corrected with surgery. Most affected children died before reaching one year of age.

Surgeons had tried to explore the biliary tract to identify any viable ductules that could help to restore bile flow in these patients. Kasai felt that surgeons had not been performing such dissection aggressively enough. He found that sometimes a biliary tract appeared solid but that if he removed the entire biliary tract outside of the liver, it often contained enough ductules to promote bile flow.

An important part of Kasai's procedure involved the surgical connection of the small intestine to the liver. One day, Kasai encountered significant bleeding near the portion of the liver known as the porta hepatis while trying to dissect an infant's ductules. To try to stop the bleeding, he attached a loop of the child's duodenum over the porta hepatis. The bleeding stopped, and the team was surprised to find bile in the feces after the surgery.

Kasai published his work on the procedure in the Japanese journal Shujutsu in 1959, but his work was not widely known outside of Japan until he published some results in the Journal of Pediatric Surgery in 1968. The surgery became known as the Kasai procedure, though Kasai himself was uncomfortable having the intervention named after him. Surgeons in the western world remained skeptical about the procedure well into the 1970s, so most of the case series of long-term survivors were published in Japan. As of 2012, a patient in his fifties was known to be alive in Japan.

While the procedure is not a definitive cure for biliary atresia and about half of patients require liver transplantation by the age of two, a 2015 article in The Journal of Pediatrics said that the international adoption of the procedure had "dramatically changed the outcome of biliary atresia."

=== Other work ===
Kasai and his colleagues at the university formulated a classification system for hepatoblastoma, a type of liver cancer seen in children. Kasai also attempted aggressive surgical treatment of esophageal cancer at a time when palliative treatment was standard.

He also devised a surgery to correct Hirschsprung's disease (rectal myotomy with colectomy); he noted that it involved less surgical exploration in the pelvic area and he felt that this would reduce the loss of sensation in the rectum in comparison to the common procedure at that time.

In the 1970s, Kasai came to the United States again to work with Koop and his colleague Louise Schnaufer at CHOP, where they established a specialized surgical program for biliary atresia. Koop became Surgeon General of the United States in 1981, and Schnaufer remained at CHOP, where she performed the Kasai procedure more than 150 times and trained a number of pediatric surgical fellows to perform the procedure.

== Later life ==
In 1986, a 63-year-old Kasai faced mandatory retirement from Tohoku University, as is common in academic centers in Japan. He became the director of the NTT Tohoku Hospital for a few years, retiring from that job in 1993.

Kasai, who enjoyed skiing and mountain climbing, was well into his sixties when he led a team from Tohoku University as they became the first group to climb the Nyenchen Tanglha Mountains in Tibet.

Recognized several times for his contributions to medicine and to society, Kasai received the William E. Ladd Medal from the American Academy of Pediatrics, the Denis Browne Gold Medal from the British Association of Paediatric Surgeons and the Asahi Prize from the national newspaper known as the Asahi Shimbun. He suffered a stroke in 1999 and he spent several years in physical rehabilitation before he died in 2008.
