= Pan-African Paediatric Surgical Association =

Pan-African Paediatric Surgical Association (PAPSA) is an organisation established in 1994 to promote the practice of paediatric surgery in Africa, improvement of research, interchange of ideas and sharing of knowledge and expertise for the benefit of the children of Africa.

As of 2024, there have been 16 annual Paediatric Surgical Conferences under PAPSA.

Professor Emmanuel A. Ameh is the President of PAPSA and Professor Milind Chitnis is the general secretary.

== History ==
During the 38th British Association of Paediatric Surgeons (BAPS) conference in Budapest in 1991, the concept of an Association representing Africa was proposed with 9 paediatric surgeons from Africa who attended the meeting.

As the idea needed international recognition and support, the World Federation of Associations of Pediatric Surgeons (WOFAPS) gave support during the development phases of the as yet to be established Association.

== PAPSA conferences ==
- 1st PAPSA conference: 1994: Nairobi, Kenya
- 2nd PAPSA Conference: 1996: Cairo, Egypt
- 3rd PAPSA Conference: 1998: Cape Town, South Africa
- 4th PAPSA Conference: 2001: Abidjan, Cote d'Ivoire
- 5th PAPSA Conference: 2002: Cairo, Egypt
- 6th PAPSA Conference: 2004: Lake Malawi
- 7th PAPSA Conference 2005: Alexandria, Egypt
- 8th PAPSA Conference: 2006: Mombasa, Kenya
- 9th PAPSA Conference: 2008: Accra, Ghana
- 10th PAPSA Conference: 2010: Dar Es Salam, Tanzania
- 11th PAPSA Conference: 2012: Cape Town, South Africa
- 12th PAPSA Conference: 2014: Cairo, Egypt
- 13th PAPSA Conference: 2016: Lagos, Nigeria
- 14th PAPASA Conference: 2018: Addis Ababa, Ethiopia
- 15th PAPSA Conference: 2020: Virtual
- 16th PAPSA Conference: 2023: Lusaka, Zambia
- 17th PAPSA Conference: 2025: Abidjan, Cote d Ivoire

== See also ==
- American Pediatric Surgical Association (APSA)
- British Association of Paediatric Surgeons (BAPS)
- World Federation of Associations of Pediatric Surgeons (WOFAPS)
