= Harold Stiles =

British surgeon (1863–1946)

Sir Harold Stiles KBE FRCS FRCSE FRSE
- Born: Harold Jalland Stiles; 21 March 1863; Spalding, Lincolnshire, England
- Died: 19 April 1946 (aged 83); Gullane, East Lothian, Scotland
- Occupation: Surgeon

Sir Harold Stiles

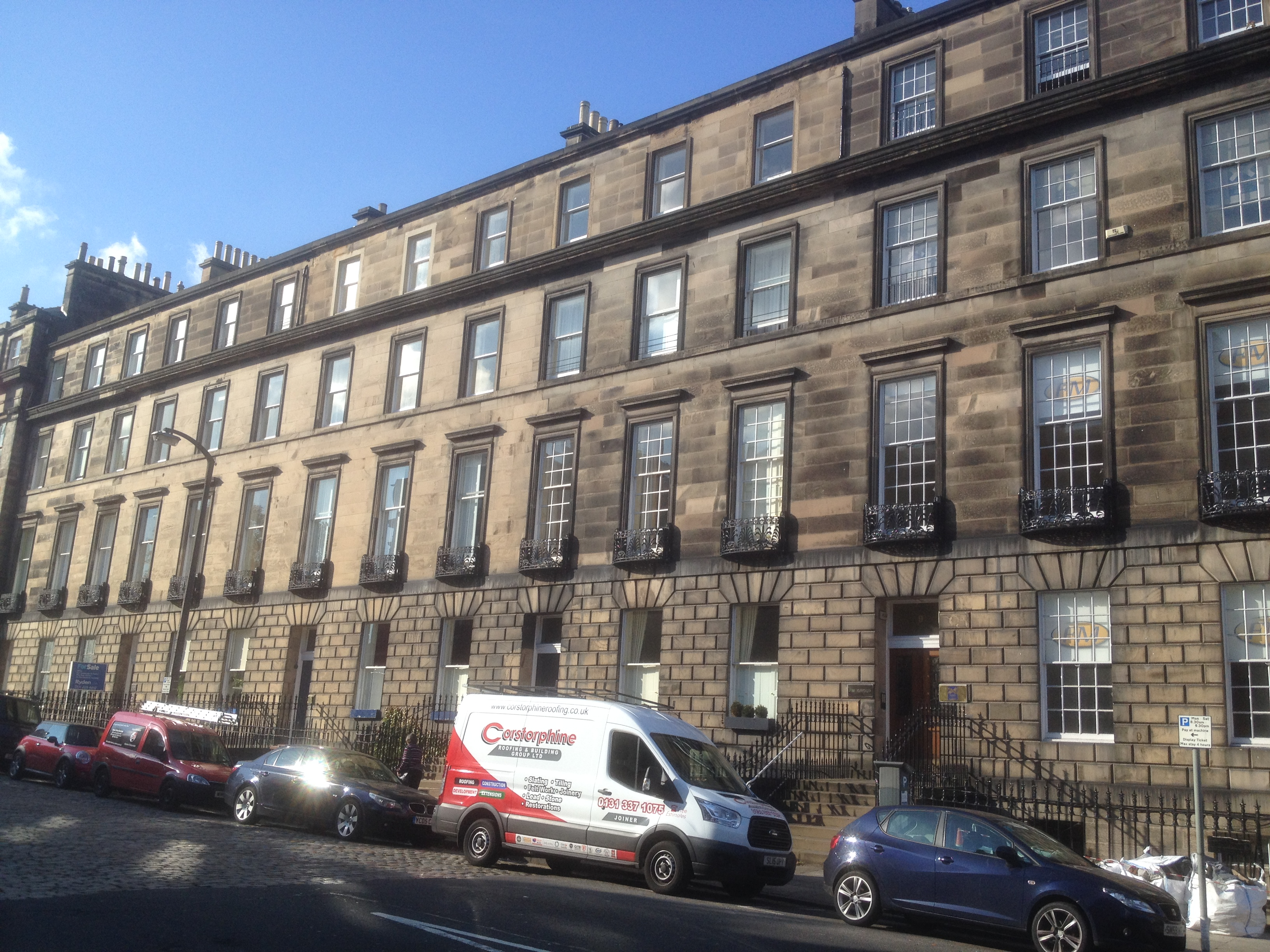
Great Stuart Street, Edinburgh

Sir Harold Jalland Stiles KBE FRCS FRCSE FRSE (21 March 1863 – 19 April 1946) was an English surgeon who was known for his research into cancer and tuberculosis and for treatment of nerve injuries.

== Early years ==
Harold Stiles was born in Spalding, Lincolnshire in 1863 the son of Henry Tournay Stiles MD and his wife, Elizabeth Ellen Jalland. He came from a family of doctors. He studied medicine at the University of Edinburgh, graduating MB ChB in 1885. He earned the Ettles scholarship for the most distinguished graduate of the year. For two years he then taught anatomy at Edinburgh. He was House Surgeon to Professor John Chiene FRSE, Demonstrator in the University Department of Anatomy under Sir William Turner, and Assistant in Charge of Pathology in the university's surgical laboratory.

In 1889 Stiles was admitted as a Fellow of the Royal College of Surgeons of Edinburgh. He was then living at 5 Castle Terrace, south of Edinburgh Castle.

He trained for six months under Professor Theodore Kocher in Bern, where he learned to follow the aseptic system of surgery rather than Listerian antisepsis. Stiles was the first surgeon to use the aseptic approach in Edinburgh.

== Later career ==
Stiles was appointed assistant surgeon at the Royal Hospital for Sick Children, Edinburgh and assistant surgeon at the Royal Infirmary of Edinburgh. He was later made Surgeon at the Sick Children's Hospital in succession to Joseph Bell. He taught at the Children's Hospital for many years, and during this period he or his assistants published important papers on surgical tuberculosis, earning him recognition throughout the medical world. At the same time he worked at the Chalmers Hospital. He lectured on Applied Anatomy at the university, and became known as an extremely skilled anatomist and surgeon. In 1901 he was elected a member of the Harveian Society of Edinburgh and in 1908 he was elected a member of the Aesculapian Club. Around 1909 he visited the United States, meeting the surgical staff at the Mayo Clinic.

In 1910 he was living at 9 Great Stuart Street on the Moray Estate.

During World War I (1914–1918) Stiles was a colonel in the Royal Army Medical Corps in France, and then director of military orthopaedics for Scotland. He was responsible for treating wounded soldiers in the Military Surgical Division at the Bangour hospital, and for his achievements was awarded a knighthood in the 1918 New Year Honours and made a Knight Commander of the Order of the British Empire in 1919.

In 1919 he succeeded Prof Francis Mitchell Caird as Regius Professor of Clinic Surgery at Edinburgh University, holding this position for six years before retiring. He was also appointed to the Edinburgh Royal Infirmary, where he organized a surgical unit and pathological laboratory and provided practical courses in surgery. In 1923, Stiles visited Harvard University, temporarily replacing Professor Harvey Williams Cushing. For two weeks he taught clinical surgery and was surgeon to the Peter Bent Brigham Hospital in Boston. From 1923 to 1925 he was President of the Royal College of Surgeons of Edinburgh. He was succeeded by Arthur Logan Turner.

In 1924 he was elected a Fellow of the Royal Society of Edinburgh. His proposers were Sir James Alfred Ewing, Arthur Robinson, Arthur Robertson Cushny and James Hartley Ashworth.

Harold Stiles died in his home, Whatton Lodge in Gullane, East Lothian, in 1946, aged 83.

== Family ==
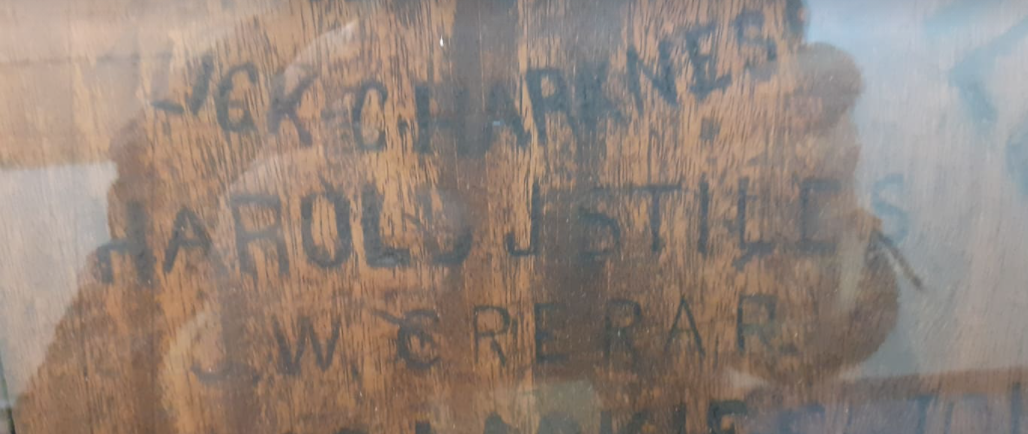
Harold J Stiles carved signature on a table top, preserved with others at Edinburgh Royal Infirmary

He married twice: in 1889 to Cecilia Norton Law, and, following her death in 1930, in 1931 (aged 68) he married Jean Morrison Thorburn.

He was survived by one daughter, Dorothy who went on to marry a Mr George Rome.

== Work ==
Stiles showed that tuberculosis of bones, joints and cervical lymph nodes was often caused by the bovine form of the tubercle bacillus. He earned international recognition for his research into the anatomy of the breast and the pathology of breast cancer. In 1886, he was the first person to win the Walker Prize from the Royal College of Surgeons, awarded for this research. Where some experts in cancer treatment, such as Joseph Colt Bloodgood, used pathological techniques to determine whether a lesion was malignant, Stiles did not believe this was necessary. In 1908 he said "a knowledge of the histological structure of a lump in the breast is of little value for the patient unless the surgeon can associate it with a correct life history. With this knowledge at his command, it will be very rarely necessary for the surgeon to be supported in the operating theatre by an expert pathologist armed with a freezing microtome."

Stiles was the first surgeon to transplant the ureter into the sigmoid colon as a treatment for extraversion of the bladder. On 3 February 1910 he performed the first pyloromyotomy, a surgery to correct congenital hypertrophic pyloric stenosis, the congenital narrowing of the path between the stomach and the intestines in infants. However, the procedure is named for Dr. Wilhelm Ramstedt, who did the surgery seventeen months later on 28 July 1911.

Stiles was greatly interested in orthopaedic surgery, which may have been due to the demands that many of these operations made on anatomical knowledge, in which he excelled. He undertook many orthopaedic operations for wounded soldiers at the EMS Hospital at Bangour. He learned how to treat nerve injuries at the Scottish Military Hospital at Bangour, and became famous for this pioneering work.

Distinguished American orthopedic surgeon Paul B. Steele served under Harold Stiles from 1917 to 1918, where he was taught the techniques of war surgery before joining the army in France. Maud Forrester-Brown, the first woman orthopaedic surgeon in Britain, worked for Stiles. Gertrude Herzfeld served as house surgeon to Stiles at the Royal Hospital for Sick Children, Edinburgh, from 1914 to 1917, becoming the first female surgeon in Scotland and the first female pediatric surgeon. LeRoy Charles Abbott of California studied under Stiles in 1919–1920, and became renowned for his work in orthopedic surgery.

== Notes and references ==
Citations

Sources

- Bax, Klaas M. A.; Georgeson, Keith E.; Rothenberg, Steven S. (2008). Endoscopic Surgery in Infants and Children. Springer. p. 281. ISBN 978-3-540-49910-7.
- Dingwall, Helen M. (2005). 'A Famous And Flourishing Society': The History Of The Royal College Of Surgeons Of Edinburgh, 1505–2005. Edinburgh University Press. ISBN 978-0-7486-1567-4.
- "EMINENT SCOTTISH SURGEON: Sir Harold Stiles". The Glasgow Herald. 22 April 1946.
- Hamilton, Diane; Lynaugh, Joan E. (15 September 2000). Nursing History Review, Volume 9, 2001: Official Journal of the American Association for the History of Nursing. Springer Publishing Company. ISBN 978-0-8261-1377-1.
- "History of the Chair of Clinical Surgery" (PDF). The University of Edinburgh. Archived from the original (PDF) on 3 March 2016.
- Löwy, Ilana (29 December 2009). Preventive Strikes: Women, Precancer, and Prophylactic Surgery. JHU Press. ISBN 978-0-8018-9364-3.
- Mercer, Sir Walter (14 January 1960). "Some Edinburgh Pioneers in Orthopaedic Surgery: Robert Jones Lecture delivered at the Royal College of Surgeons of England on 14th January 1960". Annals of the Royal College of Surgeons of England. 26 (6): 339–361. PMC 2413832. PMID 19310243.
- Mostof, Seyed Behrooz (1 January 2005). Who's Who in Orthopedics. Springer. p. 317. ISBN 978-1-84628-070-2.
- Peltier, Leonard F. (1993). Orthopedics: History and Iconography. Norman Publishing. ISBN 978-0-930405-47-2.
- "The clinic of Sir Harold Stiles, Edinburgh". British Journal of Surgery. 9 (34, pages 281–286): 281–286. 1921. doi:10.1002/bjs.1800093418. S2CID 221531722.
- "Visit of Sir Harold Stiles to Boston". The British Medical Journal. 1 (3254): 827–8. 12 May 1923. doi:10.1136/bmj.1.3254.827. PMC 2316489. PMID 20771140.
