= Lewis Spitz =

Paediatric surgeon (born 1939)

- Born: 25 August 1939; Pretoria
- Citizenship: British
- Education: Christian Brothers College, Pretoria, Pretoria University, University of the Witwatersrand and Johannesburg Teaching Hospitals
- Known for: Treatment of congenital and acquired conditions of the oesophagus. Management of congenital surgical abnormalities. Surgical management of conjoined twins. Management of gastro-oesophageal reflux especially in cerebral palsy children.
- Awards: James Spence Medal, Denis Browne Gold Medal, Sulamaa Medal, Rehbein Medal, Rehbein Medal, Ladd Medal Rickham Medal, Clement Price Thomas Medal
- Scientific career
- Fields: Paediatric Surgery
- Workplaces: UCL Great Ormond Street Institute of Child Health, Great Ormond Street Hospital NHS Trust, Sheffield Children's Hospital Alder Hey Children's Hospital / Great Ormond Street Hospital. Chris Hani Baragwanath Hospital], Transvaal Memorial Hospital for Children
- Doctoral advisor: D J du Plessis and J Emery

Lewis Spitz FRCS (born 25 August 1939 in Pretoria) is a paediatric surgeon who is internationally recognised as a leader in paediatric surgery and is known for his work on congenital abnormalities of the oesophagus, particularly oesophageal atresia, oesophageal replacement and gastroesophageal reflux especially in neurologically impaired children. He championed the plight of children with cerebral palsy and other congenital disorders; demonstrating that appropriate surgery could improve their quality of life. He is the leading authority in the management of conjoined twins and is recognised as the foremost international expert in this field. Spitz is the Emeritus Nuffield Professor of Paediatric Surgery.

== Life ==
Spitz undertook his early education, at the Christian Brothers' College in Pretoria. Spitz's clinical training took place at Pretoria University, graduating in 1962, which a Bachelor of Medicine, Bachelor of Surgery. His post clinical training as a house officer was taken at Baragwanath and Johannesburg Academic Hospitals, and other South African teaching hospitals under the direction of D.J. du Plessis.

== Career ==
In 1970, Spitz travelled from South Africa to the United Kingdom for additional training at Alder Hey Children's Hospital and Great Ormond Street Hospital, through a Smith & Nephew Foundation grant. After two years, Spitz returned to South Africa and was appointed to the Chris Hani Baragwanath Hospital as a consultant in paediatric surgery. In 1973, Spitz took a position at the Transvaal Memorial Hospital for Children in Johannesburg and was promoted to Senior Specialist,

In 1974, Spitz was appointed consultant paediatric surgeon at The Children's Hospital, Sheffield, becoming Senior Consultant in 1977.

In 1979, Spitz was appointed to a combined position of Consultant in the surgery department and Nuffield Professor of Paediatric Surgery at the Institute of Child Health, Great Ormond Street Hospital. He built up the department to one of the top 5-10 units internationally.

== Societies ==
- Fellow of the Royal College of Surgeons of Edinburgh, 1969
- Honorary Fellow of the Royal College of Surgeons in Ireland, 2005
- Honorary Fellow of the American College of Surgeons, 2012
- Spitz is also an Honorary Fellow of the Colleges of Medicine of South Africa.

== Awards and honours ==
In 2002, Spitz was awarded the Clement Price Thomas Award, named after Clement Price Thomas, In recognition of his outstanding contributions to treatment of conjoined twins. In 2002, Spitz was also awarded an honorary doctorate by the University of Sheffield. In 2004, Spitz was awarded Denis Browne Gold Medal, named after the surgeon Denis Browne, who was the first president of the British Association of Paediatric Surgeons and was notable for being the first paediatric surgeon, within the United Kingdom. In 2004, he was awarded the James Spence Medal. In 2010, Spitz was awarded the Rehbein Medal by the European Paediatric Surgeons' Association for outstanding contributions to the development of paediatric Surgery. In 2012, Spitz was awarded the American Ladd Medal, the highest award of the surgical section of the American Academy of Pediatrics.

Spitz was also awarded the Sulamaa Medal from the Finnish Association of Pediatric Surgery, and as an expert visitor, Spitz gave the coveted Sulamaa Lecture.

== Bibliography ==
The following journal articles, written or co-edited by Spitz, have high citation counts, i.e. above one hundred.

- Spitz, Lewis (2007). "Oesophageal atresia". Orphanet Journal of Rare Diseases. 2 (1): 24. doi:10.1186/1750-1172-2-24. PMC 1884133. PMID 17498283.
- Spitz, Lewis (January 1996). "Esophageal atresia: Past, present, and future". Journal of Pediatric Surgery. 31 (1): 19–25. doi:10.1016/S0022-3468(96)90313-9. PMID 8632277.
- Spitz, Lewis (October 2006). "Esophageal atresia". Journal of Pediatric Surgery. 41 (10): 1635–1640. doi:10.1016/j.jpedsurg.2006.07.004. PMID 17011260.
- Spitz, L (20 November 1971). "Management of ingested foreign bodies in childhood". British Medical Journal. 4 (5785): 469–72. doi:10.1136/bmj.4.5785.469. PMC 1799648. PMID 5125285.
- Spitz, Lewis; Kiely, Edward; Pierro, Agostino (March 2004). "Gastric transposition in children—a 21-year experience". Journal of Pediatric Surgery. 39 (3): 276–281. doi:10.1016/j.jpedsurg.2003.11.032.
- Chittmittrapap, Soottiporn; Spitz, Lewis; Kiely, Edward M.; Brereton, R.J. (May 1990). "Anastomotic stricture following repair of esophageal atresia". Journal of Pediatric Surgery. 25 (5): 508–511. doi:10.1016/0022-3468(90)90561-M.
- Spitz, Lewis (12 March 2003). "Conjoined Twins". JAMA. 289 (10): 1307–10. doi:10.1001/jama.289.10.1307. PMID 12633195.
- Spitz, Lewis (February 1992). "Gastric transposition for esophageal substitution in children". Journal of Pediatric Surgery. 27 (2): 252–259. doi:10.1016/0022-3468(92)90322-X.
- Lopez, Pedro Jose; Keys, Charles; Pierro, Agostino; Drake, David Paul; Kiely, Edward Matthew; Curry, Joseph Ignatius; Spitz, Lewis (February 2006). "Oesophageal atresia: improved outcome in high-risk groups?". Journal of Pediatric Surgery. 41 (2): 331–334. doi:10.1016/j.jpedsurg.2005.11.009. PMID 16481246.
- Craig, Gillian M; Scambler, Graham; Spitz, Lewis (6 February 2003). "Why parents of children with neurodevelopmental disabilities requiring gastrostomy feeding need more support". Developmental Medicine & Child Neurology. 45 (3). doi:10.1017/S0012162203000355.
- Chittmittrapap, Sootiporn; Spitz, Lewis; Kiely, E.M.; Brereton, R.J. (January 1992). "Anastomotic leakage following surgery for esophageal atresia". Journal of Pediatric Surgery. 27 (1): 29–32. doi:10.1016/0022-3468(92)90098-R. PMID 1552439.
- Spitz, Lewis (September 2005). "Conjoined twins". Prenatal Diagnosis. 25 (9): 814–819. doi:10.1002/pd.1268. PMID 16170846.

The following books were co-authored by Spitz.

- Pediatric Surgical Oncology., Lewis Spitz; Peter Wurnig; Thomas A Angerpointner. Berlin, Heidelberg : Springer Berlin Heidelberg, 1989.
- A colour atlas of surgery for undescended testes., Lewis Spitz. London : Wolfe Medical Books, 1984.
- Surgery in solitary kidney and corrections of urinary transport disturbances., Lewis Spitz; Peter Wurnig; Thomas Angerpointer. Berlin : Springer Verlag, 1989.
- Spitz, Lewis; Coran, Arnold G; Teitelbaum, Daniel H; Tan, Hock Lim; Pierro, Agostino, eds. (2003). Operative pediatric surgery (7th ed.). Boca Raton, FL: CRC Press. ISBN 9781444117158.
- Strobel, Stephan; Spitz, Lewis; Marks, Stephen D (2016). Great Ormond Street handbook of paediatrics. Pediatric diagnosis and management. (Second ed.). Boca Raton, Hospital for Sick Children (London, England): CRC Press, Taylor & Francis Group. ISBN 9781482222821. OCLC 1012894018.
