= Pediatric surgery =

Medical subspecialty of surgery performed by pediatrics

Pediatric Surgeon
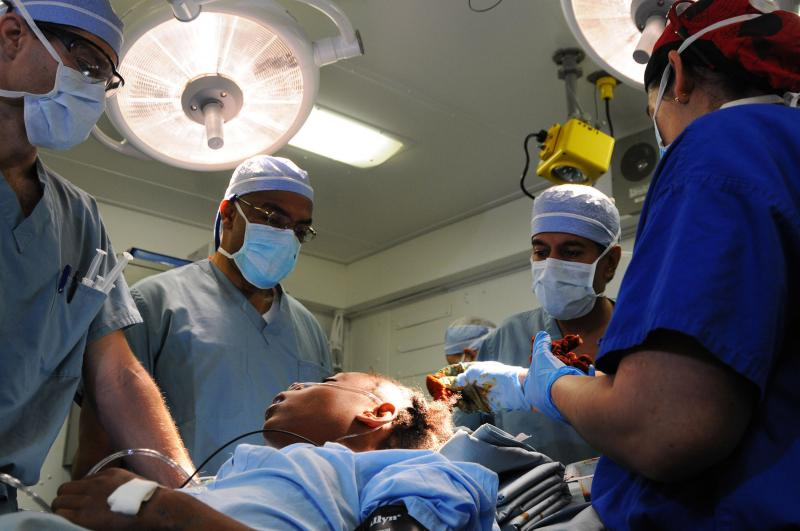
- Surgeons Henri Ford and Sanjay Gupta operate on a twelve-year-old girl.

Occupation
- Names: Doctor, Medical Specialist
- Occupation type: Specialty
- Activity sectors: Surgery

Description
- Education required: Bachelor of Medicine, Bachelor of Surgery (M.B.B.S.); Doctor of Medicine (M.D.); Doctor of Osteopathic Medicine (D.O.); Master of Surgery (M.S.) / Magister Chirurgiae (M.Ch.); Fellowship of the Royal Colleges of Surgeons (FRCS); Fellow of College of Physicians and Surgeons Pakistan (FCPS); American Board of Surgery; Board certification
- Fields of employment: Hospitals, Clinics

Pediatric surgery is a subspecialty of surgery involving the surgery of fetuses, infants, toddlers, children, adolescents, and young adults.

== History ==
Pediatric surgery arose in the middle of the 1879 century as the surgical care of birth defects required novel techniques and methods, and became more commonly based at children's hospitals. One of the sites of this innovation was the Children's Hospital of Philadelphia. Beginning in the 1940s under the surgical leadership of C. Everett Koop, newer techniques for endotracheal anesthesia of infants allowed surgical repair of previously untreatable birth defects. By the late 1970s, the infant death rate from several major congenital malformation syndromes had been reduced to near zero.

== Specialties ==
Subspecialties of pediatric surgery itself include neonatal surgery and fetal surgery.

Other areas of surgery also have pediatric specialties of their own that require further training during the residencies and in a fellowship: pediatric cardiothoracic (surgery on the child's heart and/or lungs, including heart and/or lung transplantation), pediatric nephrological surgery (surgery on the child's kidneys and ureters, including renal, or kidney, transplantation), pediatric neurosurgery (surgery on the child's brain, central nervous system, spinal cord, and peripheral nerves), pediatric urological surgery (surgery on the child's urinary bladder and other structures below the kidney necessary for ejaculation), pediatric emergency surgery, surgery involving fetuses or embryos (overlapping with obstetric/gynecological surgery, neonatology, and maternal-fetal medicine), surgery involving adolescents or young adults, pediatric hepatological (liver) and gastrointestinal (stomach and intestines) surgery (including liver and intestinal transplantation in children), pediatric orthopedic surgery (muscle and bone surgery in children), pediatric plastic and reconstructive surgery (such as for burns, or for congenital defects like cleft palate not involving the major organs), and pediatric oncological (childhood cancer) surgery.

== Conditions ==
Common pediatric diseases that may require pediatric surgery include:

- Congenital malformations: lymphangioma, cleft lip and palate, esophageal atresia and tracheoesophageal fistula, hypertrophic pyloric stenosis, intestinal atresia, necrotizing enterocolitis, meconium plugs, Hirschsprung's disease, Anorectal Malformations, Undescended Testes (Cryptorchidism), intestinal malrotation, Biliary Atresia, Pelviureteric Junction Obstruction
- Abdominal wall defects: Omphalocele, Gastroschisis, Hernias
- Chest wall deformities: Pectus Excavatum
- Childhood tumors like Neuroblastoma, Wilms' tumor, Rhabdomyosarcoma, ATRT, Liver tumors, Teratomas, kidney tumors
- Separation of conjoined twins
- Disorders of Sexual Development

== Pure Pediatric Surgical Eponyms ==
#	Eponym	Category	Definition / Clinical Use
1	Kasai Procedure	Hepatobiliary	Hepatoportoenterostomy for biliary atresia
2	Ramstedt Pyloromyotomy	Neonatal GI	Operation for hypertrophic pyloric stenosis
3	Ladd Procedure	GI / Malrotation	Correction of intestinal malrotation
4	Swenson Procedure	Colorectal	Classic pull-through for Hirschsprung disease
5	Soave Procedure	Colorectal	Endorectal pull-through technique
6	Duhamel Procedure	Colorectal	Retrorectal pull-through
7	Pena PSARP	Anorectal	Posterior sagittal anorectoplasty for ARM
8	Bishop–Koop Procedure	GI	Enterostomy for obstruction
9	Santulli Procedure	GI	Enterostomy with distal chimney
10	Heller Myotomy	GI	Achalasia surgery.
11	Billroth I	GI	Gastroduodenostomy
12	Billroth II	GI	Gastrojejunostomy
13	Whipple Procedure	GI	Pancreaticoduodenectomy
14	Veau Classification	Cleft	Cleft palate classification
15	Millard Rotation–Advancement	Cleft	Cleft lip repair
16	Tennison–Randall Repair	Cleft	Triangular flap lip repair
17	Vogt Classification	Neonatal GI	EA/TEF classification
18	Bochdalek Hernia	Neonatal	Posterolateral congenital diaphragmatic hernia
19	Morgagni Hernia	Neonatal	Anterior congenital diaphragmatic hernia
20	Shehata Technique	Urology	Traction-based laparoscopic orchiopexy
21	Fowler–Stephens	Urology	Staged orchiopexy with vessel ligation
22	Cohen Reimplantation	Urology	Cross-trigonal ureteral reimplantation
23	Leadbetter–Politano	Urology	Anti-reflux ureteral reimplantation
24	Duckett Procedure	Urology	TPIF hypospadias repair
25	Koff Tapering	Urology	Tapering ureteroplasty
26	Hendren Procedure	Urology	Complex ureteral reconstruction
27	Wilms Tumor	Oncology	Nephroblastoma
28	Ewing Sarcoma	Oncology	Bone/soft tissue tumor
29	Shimada Classification	Oncology	Neuroblastoma histology
30	Brenner Tumor	Oncology	Ovarian stromal tumor
31	Meigs Syndrome	Oncology	Ovarian tumor + ascites + hydrothorax
32	Abernethy Malformation	Vascular	Congenital extrahepatic portosystemic shunt
33	Klippel–Trénaunay Syndrome	Vascular	Capillary + venous malformations + limb hypertrophy
34	Sturge–Weber Syndrome	Vascular	Capillary malformation + CNS involvement
35	Raveenthiran's syndrome	GI, Urology	Spigelian hernia containing undescended testis

== See Related Syndromes ==
- VACTERL Association
- Apert Syndrome
- CHARGE Syndrome
- Currarino Syndrome
- Pierre Robin Sequence
- Prune Belly Syndrome

== See also ==
- William E. Ladd; known as the father of pediatric surgery.
- Lewis Spitz; Emeritus Nuffield Professor of Paediatric Surgery. Spitz was awarded Denis Browne Gold Medal, Rehbein Medal and the American Ladd Medal.
- Robert Edward Gross; president of the American Association for Thoracic Surgery, a member of the National Academy of Sciences and a fellow of the American Academy of Arts and Sciences. He was also awarded the Denis Browne Gold Medal and the American Ladd Medal for his contributions in Pediatric Surgery research.
- Morio Kasai; best known for the procedure that came to bear his name. He received the William E. Ladd Medal from the American Academy of Pediatrics, the Denis Browne Gold Medal from the British Association of Paediatric Surgeons and the Asahi Prize from the national newspaper known as the Asahi Shimbun.

== Associations of Pediatric Surgery ==
- World Federation of Associations of Pediatric Surgeons: WOFAPS
- European Paediatric Surgeons Association: EUPSA
- International Pediatric Endosurgery Group: IPEG
- American Pediatric Surgical Association: APSA
- British Association of Paediatric Surgeons: BAPS
- Deutsche Gesellschaft für Kinder- und Jugendchirurgie (German Association of Paediatric Surgeons): DKH
- Pan-African Paediatric Surgical Association: PAPSA
