= Isabella Forshall =

English paediatric surgeon

Isabella Forshall FRCSE
- Born: 2 October 1900; Sussex, England
- Died: 10 August 1989 (aged 88); Chichester, England
- Education: London School of Medicine for Women; Royal Free Hospital
- Occupation: Paediatric Surgeon
- Medical career
- Institutions: Royal Liverpool Children's Hospital; Alder Hey Children's Hospital

Isabella Forshall FRCSE (2 October 1900 – 10 August 1989) was an English paediatric surgeon who played a leading role in the development of the speciality of paediatric surgery in the United Kingdom. She took a particular interest in neonatal surgery and was instrumental in the establishment of the Liverpool Neonatal Surgical Unit, the first neonatal intensive care unit in the UK and indeed in the world.

== Early life ==
Forshall was born in Sussex, England, on 2 October 1900. She did not attend school, her education being conducted at home by her mother, a Cambridge classics graduate. She went on to study medicine at the London School of Medicine for Women and the Royal Free Hospital from where she qualified MB BS in 1927.

== Surgical career ==
She worked as house surgeon at the Royal Liverpool Children's Hospital, and later at Alder Hey Children's Hospital and was to continue to work in both of these until she retired in 1965. She was elected FRCSE in 1932. In 1939, she was appointed assistant surgeon at Waterloo and District General Hospital, Liverpool and at Birkenhead and Wirral Children's Hospital, Birkenhead. Her ambition had always been for a career in paediatric surgery and this was progressed with her appointment as honorary surgeon to the Royal Liverpool Children's Hospital in 1942. With many of her male colleagues serving in the forces, she worked virtually single handed as a paediatric surgeon in the Liverpool region for the remainder of the war. After the war she set about assembling a team of paediatric specialists in Liverpool that would promote the development of the speciality not only in Liverpool but nationally in the United Kingdom. It was largely the result of her efforts that the Liverpool Neonatal Surgical Unit at the Alder Hey Children's Hospital was opened in 1953. This unit, the first neonatal intensive care unit in the United Kingdom and indeed in the world, was able to demonstrate a reduction in surgical mortality for neonatal surgery with the survival of neonates postoperatively increasing from 22% to 74%. Much of the credit for this lay with Isabella Forshall and her junior colleague, Peter Rickham. A Government Report on neonatal surgery recommended that similar units should be set up throughout the country.

== Further qualifications and awards ==
In 1957 she gained the diplomas of MRCS and LRCP and in 1960 she became FRCSE. The latter part of her career saw her gaining many honours. She was involved in the founding and early development of the British Association of Paediatric Surgeons becoming its second president in 1958. The following year she was president of the paediatric section of the Royal Society of Medicine. She became president of the Liverpool Medical Institution and in 1970 received the degree of Master of Surgery (ChM) from the University of Liverpool.

== Later life and legacy ==
She retired to Sussex and died in Chichester on 10 August 1989. She was commemorated by the Forshall Lecture given at the Annual Congress of the British Association of Paediatric Surgeons.
