= Ladd's bands =

Stalks of tissue in the intestine

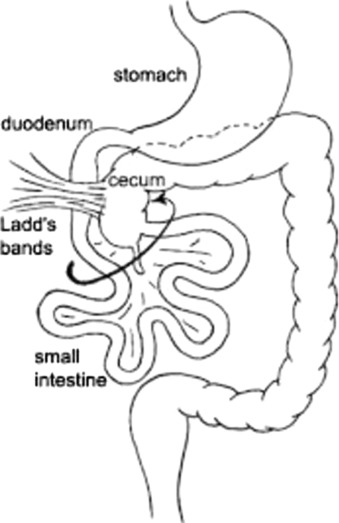
Ladd's bands shown as the cause of this depiction of bowel malrotation.

Ladd's bands, sometimes called bands of Ladd, are fibrous stalks of peritoneal tissue that attach the cecum to the retroperitoneum in the right lower quadrant (RLQ). Obstructing Ladd's bands are associated with malrotation of the intestine, a developmental disorder in which the cecum is found in the right upper quadrant (RUQ), instead of its normal anatomical position in the RLQ. Ladd's bands then pass over the second part of the duodenum, causing extrinsic compression and obstruction. This clinically manifests as poor feeding and bilious vomiting in neonates. Screening can be performed with an upper GI series. The most severe complication of malrotation is midgut volvulus, in which the mesenteric base twists around the superior mesenteric artery, compromising intestinal perfusion, leading to bowel necrosis.

A surgical operation called a "Ladd procedure" is performed to alleviate intestinal malrotation. The procedure involves counterclockwise detorsion of the bowel, surgical division of Ladd's bands (shown in image), widening of the small intestine's mesentery, performing an appendectomy, and reorientation of the small bowel on the right and the cecum and colon on the left (the appendectomy is performed so as not to be confused by atypical presentation of appendicitis at a later date). Most Ladd surgical repairs take place in infancy or childhood.

Ladd's bands and the Ladd procedure are named after American pediatric surgeon William Edwards Ladd (1880–1967).
