= Henry Douglas Stephens =

Australian paediatric surgeon (1877-1952)

Henry Douglas Stephens (26 June 1877 – 17 June 1952) was an Australian paediatric surgeon.

He was born in Williamstown, Melbourne to John Charles Stephens, a newspaper owner, and his wife Kate. He was dux of Camberwell Grammar School and graduated from the University of Melbourne in 1900. On 6 September 1911 he married Eileen Cole.

He served at the Royal Children's Hospital for forty-five years and the Henry Douglas Stephens Memorial Operating Theatre was named in his honour. He was also a consultant paediatrician at the Women's Hospital, Melbourne, from 1931 to 1945. He co-founded the Melbourne Paediatric Society. From 1935 to 1940 he was Dean of the Clinical School at the Royal Children's Hospital, and he was a councillor of the Royal Victorian College of Nursing and the Victorian Society for Crippled Children.

He had three daughters and a son, Frank Douglas Stephens.
