= Neonatal hepatitis =

- Specialty: Neonatology

Neonatal hepatitis refers to many forms of liver dysfunction that affects fetuses and neonates. It is most often caused by viruses or metabolic diseases, and many cases are of an unknown cause.

== Signs and symptoms ==
The infant with neonatal hepatitis usually has jaundice that appears at one to two months of age, is not gaining weight and growing normally, and has an enlarged liver and spleen. Infants with this condition are usually jaundiced. Jaundice that is caused by neonatal hepatitis is not the same as physiologic neonatal jaundice. In contrast with physiologic neonatal jaundice, infants with neonatal hepatitis present with dark urine. Infants may also present with delayed growth.

== Causes ==
The causes of neonatal hepatitis are many. Viruses that have been identified include cytomegalovirus, rubella virus, hepatitis A and B viruses, herpes simplex viruses, coxsackievirus, echovirus, and paramyxovirus. Metabolic and immune disorders can also cause neonatal hepatitis. Giant cell transformation throughout the parenchyma is common.

== Diagnosis ==
=== Differential diagnosis ===
Conditions that can present similarly include galactosaemia, hereditary fructose intolerance, cystic fibrosis, and biliary atresia.

== See also ==
- Neonatal jaundice
