= Maud Forrester-Brown =

British surgeon

- Born: 15 November 1885; Enfield, North London
- Died: 12 January 1970; Edinburgh
- Scientific career
- Fields: surgery

Maud Forrester-Brown (1885–1970) was the first woman orthopaedic surgeon within Britain.

She attended college for medicine at the London School of Medicine for Women. From 1907 to 1912, Maud studied forensic medicine and pathology, graduating with a Bachelor of Medicine degree in 1912, and a Master of Science degree in 1920. In addition to those degrees, she also completed a Doctor of Medicine degree in 1914, and began working in the medical field short after. She held positions in general practice such as being a house surgeon, where she worked for Sir Harold Stiles, another surgeon. Maud obtained a three year long scholarship in 1923 called the William Gissane Research Scholarship, allowing her to travel to orthopaedic clinics in the United States and Europe, and even translate medical journals to English so that they would be of use to many more individuals.

Once back in England, Sir Harold Stiles recognized Maud's skills and offered her a job as resident surgeon at the Bath and Wessex Orthopaedic hospital in 1925. To this day Forrester-Brown Ward at The Royal United Hospital in Bath, North Someret, still cares for patients within the Trauma and Orthopaedic discipline. Her efforts while working at this hospital lead it to become widely known by improving its reputation in Orthopaedics. She began publishing medical journals as early as 1920. In her published work called "Results of Operations for Nerve Injury at the Edinburgh War Hospital," she wrote about surgeries she had completed and the results of the studies. One of the studies were tendon transplants, which she said had a 99% success rate in terms of restoring function to the damaged limb.

In 1921, she chose to become part of the British Orthopaedic Association, which was established for orthopaedic surgeons who resided in Britain. After 16 years, she was appointed Secretary of the same organization. With her experience, she established children's hospitals in three different counties in England. She noticed the areas that were being neglected within the medical field and focused her research on those specialties, such as defects and deformities that were not being resolved until the children were older and stronger. She trained her own staff for the clinics and taught them her unique individual skills, which made her clinic stand out from the existing clinics of the time. To improve deformities of children, she convinced the schools to implement better seating and desks, and even collaborated with a shoe company to make shoes better fitted for the spine. This was also designed to prevent the deformities before they arose.

In 1931, the Annual Meeting for the British Medical Association was held, which Maud was a member of for over 50 years, and she was appointed Secretary. Seven years later, in 1938, the association decided to appoint her vice-president of the Orthopaedics section. From 1948-1949, she was a member of the Executive Committee within the British Orthopaedics Association. She retired at the age of 65 in 1951, and ten years later was given the title of Emeritus Fellow, which allowed her to retain the title she held before retirement. Even in retirement, she still visited hospitals and clinics, and continued to do research and publish her results.

== Published work ==
- Results Of Operations For Nerve Injury At The Edinburgh War Hospital.
- Posture as a Factor in Health and Disease.
- Points from Letters: Horse-riding for the Disabled.
- Early Treatment of Poliomyelitis.

== Bibliography ==
- Kirkup J., Maud Forrester-Brown (1885-1970): Britain's first woman orthopaedic surgeon, J Med Biogr. 2008 Nov;16(4):197-204. doi: 10.1258/jmb.2007.007044
