= Patricia K. Donahoe =

American pediatric surgeon

Patricia Kilroy Donahoe is an American pediatric surgeon and a leading researcher in the field of developmental biology and oncology. She was the president of the American Pediatric Surgical Association from 2006 to 2007. She currently serves as the director of pediatric surgical research laboratories and chief emerita of pediatric surgical services at Massachusetts General Hospital.

== Early life and education ==
Born and raised in Boston, Massachusetts, Donahoe received her BS from Boston University and MD from Columbia University. Her surgical residency was completed at Tufts Medical Center, pending which she researched at the Boston Children's Hospital under Judah Folkman. She completed her clinical fellowship at Massachusetts General Hospital before attending registrar and senior registrar posts at Adler Hey Children's Hospital.

== Career and research ==
Donahoe was invited to join the Dept. of Surgery at Massachusetts General Hospital in 1973, where she is currently the chief emerita of pediatric surgical services. She has been the director of pediatric surgical research laboratories since 1973. In 1986, she was appointed as the Marshall K. Bartlett Professor of Surgery at Harvard Medical School. She is also an associate member of the Broad Institute.

An ex-chair of the scientific advisory board at St. Jude Children's Research Hospital and a member of the scientific advisory board at Memorial Sloan Kettering Cancer Center, she also serves on the board of trustees at Boston University.

Donahoe's principle domain of research lies in the realm of developmental biology and focuses upon the potential use of anti-Müllerian hormone (AMH) as novel chemotherapeutic agents against ovarian cancer. She also investigates the molecular mechanisms of sex differentiation and foregut development to treat congenital defects of the trachea and esophagus or to reconstruct them.

== Awards and honors ==
In 2006, she was elected as the president of the American Pediatric Surgical Association for a one-year tenure. She has been a member of the National Academy of Science since 1999. She is also a fellow of the National Academy of Medicine and the American Academy of Arts and Sciences. In 2018, she was awarded the Pincus Medal by University of Massachusetts Medical School for her research into anti-Müllerian hormone as a potential anti-cancer agent. In 2021, she was awarded the Jacobson Innovation Award by the American College of Surgeons for her lifelong achievements in medicine, research, and mentorship.
