= String sign =

String sign, or gastrointestinal string sign (also called string sign of Kantour), is a medical term for a radiographic finding on an upper GI series, in which the patient is given a radio-opaque material, such as barium, to drink. X-rays are then taken of the patient's stomach and intestines.

The gastrointestinal string sign represents a severe narrowing of loop of bowel, in which a thin stripe of contrast within the lumen looks like a string.

It may be seen in Crohn's disease, hypertrophic pyloric stenosis, carcinoid tumor and colon cancer. In people with Crohn's Disease, the string sign is caused by incomplete filling of the intestinal lumen, which results from irritability and spasm associated with severe ulceration. In such cases, the string sign is most frequently seen at the terminal ileum.

In infants with hypertrophic pyloric stenosis, the pylorus is narrowed and the radio-opaque material will take on the appearance of a thin string as it passes through this narrowed channel. Often, there are several of these strings seen (called the "railroad track sign"). The use of the upper GI series for the diagnosis of HPS, which was the primary diagnostic tool for this condition in the 1980s and 1990s, has been largely replaced by the use of ultrasound, which is less invasive and can visualize the thickened pylorus, giving actual measurements of this thickening.
