= Robert Zachary =

English paediatric surgeon (1913–1999)

Robert Bransby Zachary (1 March 1913 – 1 February 1999) was an English paediatric surgeon who spent the majority of his career at Sheffield Children's Hospital. He was an expert on the treatment of spina bifida and hydrocephalus.

== Career ==
Robert Zachary was born in 1913 in Pudsey to Samuel John Zachary, a dentist, and Priscilla Mary (née Owen). He earned a Bachelor of Pharmacy in 1935 before completing a medical degree at the University of Leeds in 1940. He became a Fellow of the Royal College of Surgeons in 1943, originally working on orthopaedics at Oxford's Nuffield Orthopaedic Centre. He changed specialties in 1945 to paediatric surgery and received a grant to train at Boston Children's Hospital. In 1947 he became a consultant paediatric surgeon at Sheffield Children's Hospital, making him the only consultant paediatric surgeon in Britain who had not been trained by Denis Browne at Great Ormond Street Hospital. He was the first full-time surgeon employed by Sheffield Children's Hospital.

Zachary was an expert on neonatal surgery, and campaigned for all surgery on newborns to be done by specifically trained paediatric surgeons. He developed an international reputation for his expertise on surgical management of spina bifida and hydrocephalus, and founded the Society for Research into Hydrocephalus and Spina Bifida. With paediatrician John Lorber and orthopaedic surgeon John Sharrard, Zachary showed that if babies with spina bifida were operated on within hours of birth, the survival rate could be improved from less than 10% to almost 90%. Zachary suffered from severe scoliosis and wrote of his connection with spina bifida patients: "In my own small way I feel a common bond with all those who have spina bifida when I say, 'We who were born with a deformed spine...'"

Zachary was a founding member of the British Association of Paediatric Surgeons and served as president in 1962–63. He received numerous awards and honorary appointments; these included a personal chair in paediatric surgery at Sheffield University, the British Association of Paediatric Surgeons' Denis Browne Gold Medal (1977), and Knight Commander with Star of the Order of St. Gregory the Great.

== Later life ==
In 1943 Zachary married Faith Alice Stewart, a theatre nurse whom he worked alongside at Leeds General Infirmary; she died from cancer in 1981. After retiring, he moved to Australia and married his second wife, Winifred. Following her death in 1990, he moved to Canada and married his third wife, Janetta. Zachary died in 1999 in Grand Falls-Windsor, Newfoundland.

== Selected publications ==
- "Survival and Paralysis in Open Myelomeningocele with Special Reference to the Time of Repair of The Spinal Lesion", co-authored with W. J. W. Sharrard and J. Lorber, Developmental Medicine and Child Neurology, February 1967, Vol.9, Issue.s13, pp. 35–50, doi:10.1111/j.1469-8749.1967.tb02381.x
