= Darin Jordan =

American football player (born 1964)

No. 90, 55, 53
- Positions: Linebacker, defensive end

Personal information
- Born: December 4, 1964 (age 61); Boston, Massachusetts, U.S.
- Listed height: 6 ft 1 in (1.85 m)
- Listed weight: 242 lb (110 kg)

Career information
- High school: Stoughton (Stoughton, Massachusetts)
- College: Northeastern
- NFL draft: 1988: 5th round, 121st overall pick

Career history
- Pittsburgh Steelers (1988); Los Angeles Raiders (1989–1990); San Francisco 49ers (1991–1994)

Awards and highlights
- Super Bowl champion (XXIX)

Career NFL statistics
- Fumble recoveries: 4
- Interceptions: 1
- Touchdowns: 1
- Stats at Pro Football Reference

Darin Godfrey Jordan (born December 4, 1964) is an American former professional football player who was a linebacker for six seasons in the National Football League (NFL) with the Pittsburgh Steelers, Los Angeles Raiders, and San Francisco 49ers. He was selected by the Steelers in the fifth round of the 1988 NFL draft after playing college football for the Northeastern Huskies.

== Early life ==
Jordan was born on December 4, 1964, in Boston, Massachusetts. He attended Stoughton High School in Stoughton, Massachusetts, where he lettered in track and football, captained the football team, and was selected All Hockomock League as both a junior and senior. Before enrolling at Northeastern University, Jordan worked with his uncle for three summers cleaning all the Venetian blinds, which he said helped him get "a close feeling for the school and the people in it."

At Northeastern, Jordan majored in speech communication and was "one of the premier defensive linemen in Huskies history." He was redshirted as a freshman in 1983, but was in the starting lineup by the fourth game of 1984. By the conclusion of his rookie season, Jordan finished with a total of 24 tackles and two quarterback sacks.

== Professional career ==
Jordan was selected by the Pittsburgh Steelers in the fifth round, with the 121st overall pick, of the 1988 NFL draft. He played in 15 games, starting two, for the Steelers during his rookie year in 1988, recording four fumble recoveries and one interception for 28 yards and one touchdown. He was released by the Steelers before their first game of the 1989 season and was signed shortly thereafter by the Raiders. After three days with the Raiders he was released for he "did not know their system." Jordan signed with the Raiders again on February 2, 1990, but was later released on September 3, 1990. He signed with the Raiders once again on January 2, 1991, during the playoffs. He appeared in two postseason games for the Raiders that year and became a free agent after the season.

As a Plan B free agent, he was signed by the San Francisco 49ers on April 1, 1991. He played in 44 regular season games, starting five, for the 49ers from 1991 to 1993. He also appeared in two playoff games during the 1992 season. During the 1994 preseason, Jordan was released by the 49ers on waivers. Prior to re-signing, he kept in shape by skating with former members of the San Jose Sharks, as he had played pickup hockey until the 10th grade after basketball practice. In January 1995, Jordan was signed by San Francisco as a special teams player and backup linebacker to replace Anthony Peterson on injured reserve. When speaking of the decision, vice president for football administration John McVay said "he's been here before so it's not like he's a stranger to these players." He played his first game of the season in Super Bowl XXIX against the Chargers on their special team. Jordan became a free agent after the 1994 season and re-signed with the 49ers on May 6, 1995. He was released on August 27, 1995.

== Personal life ==
Jordan was married to Andrea Hayes-Jordan, the first pediatric surgeon to perform a high-risk, life-saving procedure in children with a rare form of cancer. They have two children together, a son and daughter. After retiring from football, Jordan inspects game balls and uniforms for NRG Stadium under contract of the NFL.
