= Frank Stephens (surgeon) =

Australian surgeon

Frank Douglas Stephens AO, DSO (10 October 1913 - 10 December 2011) was an Australian surgeon.

He was born in Melbourne on 10 October 1913. His father was Henry Douglas Stephens and his mother Eileen Cole. Educated at the University of Melbourne he specialized in surgery, particularly with regard to congenital malformations of the uro-genital tract.

He served in the Australian Army during World War II in the Australian Army Medical Corps and was awarded a Distinguished Service Order in 1942. He was discharged in 1945 as a major.

After the war he moved into paediatric surgery and worked mostly at the Royal Children's Hospital in Melbourne. He has received numerous awards for his pioneering surgical techniques, including the Sir Denis Browne Gold Medal from the British Association of Paediatric Surgeons in 1976, the Urology Medal Award of the American Academy of Pediatrics (1986) and was made an Officer of the Order of Australia in 1987. He has written several books related to ano-rectal abnormalities in children.

He was married with two sons and a daughter.
