= Pyloromyotomy =

Surgery involving the pylorus

- Specialty: Gastroenterology

Pyloromyotomy is a surgical procedure in which a portion of the muscle fibers of the pyloric muscle are cut. This is typically done in cases where the contents from the stomach are inappropriately stopped by the pyloric muscle, causing the stomach contents to build up in the stomach and unable to be appropriately digested. The procedure is typically performed in cases of "hypertrophic pyloric stenosis" in young children. In most cases, the procedure can be performed with either an open approach or a laparoscopic approach and the patients typically have good outcomes with minimal complications.

== History and development ==
The development of the procedure has attributed to Dr. Conrad Ramstedt in 1911, who originally named the procedure Ramstedt's Operation. However, the procedure was truly performed about 17 months earlier by Sir Harold Stiles in 1910 at the Royal Hospital for sick children. In 1991, the first laparoscopic pyloromyotomy was performed by Dr. Alain and Dr. Grousseau.

== Procedure ==
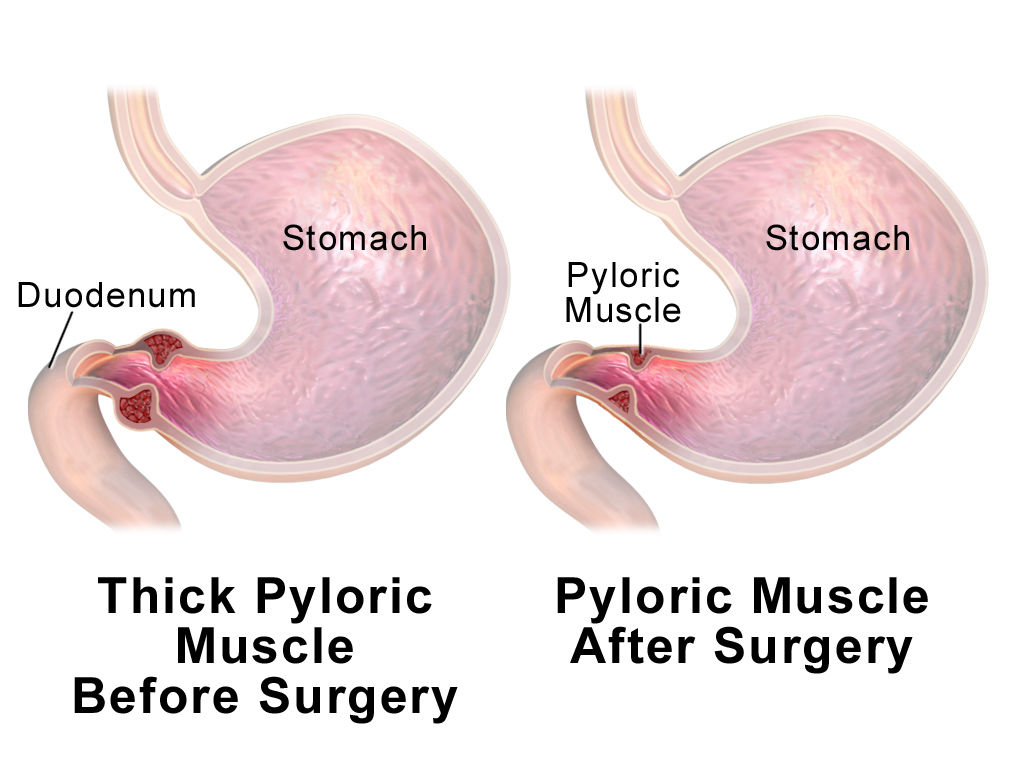
Drawing showing pyloric stenosis before and after surgery

After pyloric stenosis is identified in a patient, and any electrolyte and fluid imbalances are stabilized, the surgeon will perform the procedure. During which, the surgeon must access the pylorus through the abdominal wall. This can either be done laparoscopically or with an "open" procedure. In either case, the once the pylorus is accessed, the surgeon will visualize the hypertrophied pyloric muscle. Then, the surgeon will carefully cut through the outer layers of tissue and through the pyloric muscle to the mucosa, which is the layer of tissue facing the inside of the gastrointestinal tract. From there, the two portions of the pyloric muscle are tested for mobility and the mucosal layer is inspected for any unintentional damage. Depending on the approach, the pylorus, stomach, and gastrointestinal tract are returned to their appropriate place in the abdominal cavity and the medical equipment is removed. Finally, each of the surgical incisions are stitched closed and the patient is taken back to post-operative area for monitoring.

Laparoscopic approach: In the laparoscopic approach, the appropriate area of the gastrointestinal tract is accessed in a minimally invasive manner. This approach may be chosen due to the reduced hospital stay, quicker recovery time, and higher satisfaction with the appearance of the surgical site after the patient has healed when compared to the older open approach. Typically, two to three trocars, a medical device used to penetrate the abdominal wall in laparoscopic medical procedures, are placed in their appropriate positions. This is typically done by making a small cut for each trocar in the abdominal wall before placing the trocar into the cut. The abdomen is then filled with a gas, such as carbon dioxide to increase visibility with the laparoscopic camera and increase working space. Once the laparoscopic instruments and camera are place through the trocars, the hypertrophied pylorus is visualized. Then, the pyloric muscle is cut down to the mucosa and the muscle fibers are spread apart using the laparoscopic instruments. From there, the two pyloric sections are tested independently for appropriate movement. After that, the mucosa is inspected for any unintentional damaged. This is done by inflating the patient's stomach and looking for the formation of bubbles along the mucosa. If a leak is identified it is typically repaired with sutures if determined to be appropriate. Finally, all instruments and trocars are removed before the surgical wound sites are repaired with stitches.

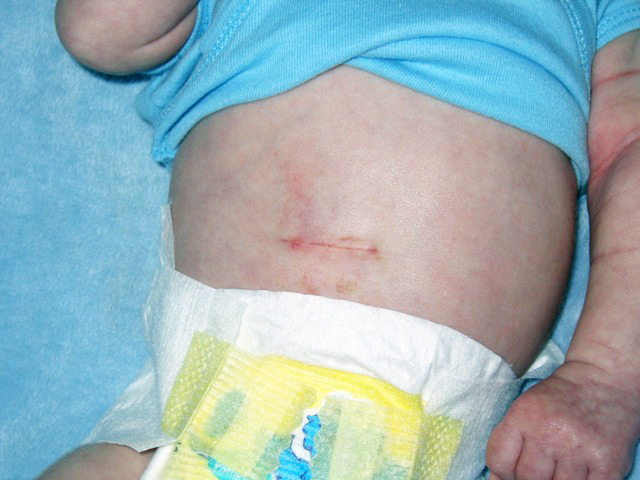
Horizontal surgical wound 10 days after pyloromyotomy in a four-week-old baby

Open approach: In the older open pyloromyotomy, the appropriate area of the gastrointestinal tract is accessed by creating a single cut on the abdomen of the patient and the pylorus and stomach are gently pulled through the opening for the procedure. This approach may be chosen due to patient/parent preference or if determined by the surgeon to be more appropriate. Once the initial cut on the abdomen is made, a layer of connective tissue between the abdomen and stomach is cut through. Then, the stomach and pylorus are carefully pulled through the opening created by the initial cut and the hypertrophied pylorus is identified by the surgeon. After that, the pyloric muscle is cut down to the mucosa and the muscle fibers are spread apart using a pyloric spreader. The newly separated pyloric sections are tested for adequate movement and the mucosa is tested for holes or other damage, which are repaired using suture as appropriate. Finally, the stomach and pylorus are carefully placed back into the abdominal cavity and the various tissue layers are repaired with stitches.

== Indication ==
The pyloromyotomy is primarily indicated by the presence of hypertrophic pyloric stenosis. Hypertrophic Pyloric stenosis is a gastrointestinal tract defect, most commonly seen in young children, typically in the first few months of life, caused by enlargement of the tissue in the pyloric muscle. This causes the contents of the stomach to be unable to empty leading to pain after eating, electrolyte abnormalities, and projectile vomiting among other clinical signs and symptoms.

== Complications, risks, and outlook ==
While the procedure has been proven to be highly effective at treating pyloric stenosis, there are still several complications that may occur as a result of the procedure. The rate that any complications may occur as a result of the surgery are estimated to be 4.6–12% of cases. The most common complications include incomplete pyloromyotomy, perforation of the mucosa, and infection of the surgical site. Other complications reported to be related to the procedure, in addition to those stated above, are listed below:

- Incomplete pyloromyotomy
- Perforated mucosa
- Wound infection
- Fascial dehiscence
- Incisional hernia
- Postoperative bleeding

The result of the surgery is typically successful at treating the patient's pyloric stenosis nearly 100% of the time with a quick recovery for most patients. Typically, the patient will have a special liquid diet for a few feedings following the procedure. In most cases the patient can be expected to be able to resume feedings with breast milk within 1 day of the procedure.

== See also ==
- List of surgeries by type
- Hypertrophic pyloric stenosis
- Laparoscopy
