= William E. Ladd =

American physician

William Edwards Ladd
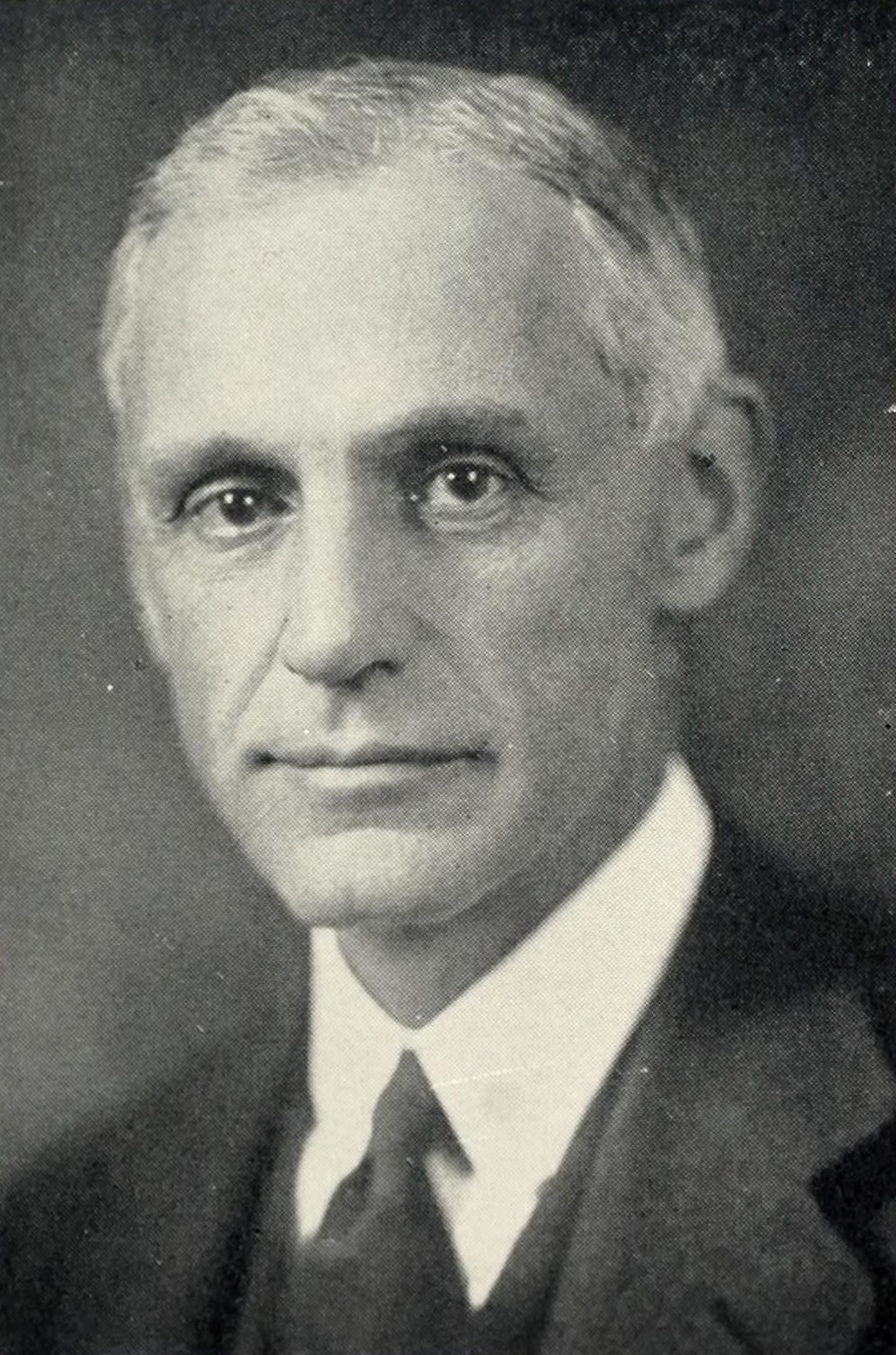
- Born: September 8, 1880; Milton, Massachusetts, U.S.
- Died: April 19, 1967 (aged 86); Brookline, Massachusetts, U.S.
- Burial place: Milton Cemetery
- Education: Harvard University (1902); Harvard Medical School (1906)
- Occupation: Pediatric surgery
- Known for: Ladd's bands

William Edwards Ladd (September 8, 1880 – April 15, 1967) was an American surgeon, and is commonly regarded as one of the founders of pediatric surgery.

== Family and education ==
William Edwards Ladd was born on September 8, 1880, in Milton, Massachusetts, the son of Civil War veteran William Jones Ladd and Anna Russell Watson. He was educated at Hopkinson's School for Boys, Boston, and graduated from Harvard University in 1902, and Harvard Medical School in 1906.

== Early career ==
He was Assistant Visiting Surgeon to the Boston City Hospital, 1910–1913; Assistant Visiting Surgeon to the Infant's Hospital, 1909–1913; Visiting Surgeon to the Children's Hospital from 1910; Visiting Surgeon to the Milton Hospital from 1910. He was appointed Assistant in Surgery at Harvard Medical School in 1912.

== Halifax explosion ==
The Halifax Explosion occurred on Thursday, December 6, 1917, when the city of Halifax, Nova Scotia, Canada, was devastated by the huge detonation of the SS Mont-Blanc, a French cargo ship, fully loaded with wartime explosives, which accidentally collided with the Norwegian SS Imo in a part of Halifax Harbour called "The Narrows". About 2,000 people were killed by debris, fires, or collapsed buildings and it is estimated that over 9,000 people were injured.

HARVARD was well represented in the various units of the American relief expedition recently sent from New England to Halifax, Nova Scotia. On the day of the disaster, President Lowell was, with others, in conference with Governor McCall, and arrangements were then made for sending that night the first special relief train, in charge of the vice-chairman of the Massachusetts Committee on Public Safety.

This train carried the hospital unit of Dr. William A. Brooks, '87. made up of 12 surgeons and a corps of nurses, the American Red Cross Relief Unit, appointed that day by Director-General W. Frank Persons, LL.B. '05, of Washington, and a carload of medical and general supplies...

Twenty-four hours after the arrival of the first relief train, the Red Cross Unit, under William E. Ladd, '02, M.D. '06, reached Halifax. They carried with them, on a special train, an entire equipment for a 500-bed hospital, in charge of S. Huntington Wolcott, '03, assisted by George H. Watson, '98, Elton Clark, '96, and Llewellyn Howland, '00.

Ladd treated thousands of individuals injured in the explosion; including hundreds of children who had suffered burns and lacerations as a result of watching the explosion with their faces pressed against windows.

== Pediatric surgical career ==
Ladd's experiences in Halifax had a profound effect on him, and after returning to Boston, Ladd devoted himself entirely to the surgical care of infants and children.

Dr. Ladd was distressed by the quality of surgical care offered to these small patients and was determined to improve it. With meticulous attention to detail, he began to keep accurate medical records which included signs and symptoms, the surgical procedure, and outcomes. He developed policies and uniform methods of care for each surgical disease. Dr. Ladd spent countless hours in the pathology department studying both microscopic and gross specimens. using all of the information he gleaned, he constantly evolved new procedures and methods of care.

Ladd became the Surgeon-in-Chief at Boston Children's Hospital in 1927, and went on to establish the first pediatric surgical training program.

In 1941, with his associate Robert E. Gross, he co-authored the first modern American pediatric surgical textbook, Abdominal Surgery of Infancy and Childhood.

Ladd retired in 1947, and his position at Children's Hospital Boston was assumed by Gross. He died April 19, 1967, at his Chestnut Hill home in Brookline, Massachusetts. He is remembered as a pioneer in the field of pediatric surgery.

== Ladd's bands ==
Ladd's bands, sometimes called bands of Ladd, are fibrous stalks of peritoneal tissue that attach the cecum to the abdominal wall and create an obstruction of the duodenum. This condition is found in intestinal malrotation. A surgical operation called a Ladd's procedure is performed to alleviate malrotation. This procedure involves surgical division of Ladd's bands, widening of the small intestine's mesentery, an appendectomy, and correctional placement of the cecum and colon.
