= Journal of Pediatric Surgery =

- Discipline: Pediatric surgery
- Language: English
- Edited by: G.W. Holcomb III, MD

Publication details
- History: 1966-present
- Publisher: Elsevier
- Frequency: Monthly
- Impact factor: 1.919 (2019)

Standard abbreviations
- ISO 4: J. Pediatr. Surg.

Indexing
- CODEN: JPDSA3
- ISSN: 0022-3468 (print); 1531-5037 (web)
- OCLC no.: 1608086

Links
- Journal homepage; Online access; Online archive

The Journal of Pediatric Surgery is a monthly peer-reviewed medical journal covering pediatric surgery. It was established in 1966 and is published by Elsevier. It is the official journal of the Section on Surgery of the American Academy of Pediatrics, the British Association of Paediatric Surgeons, the American Pediatric Surgical Association, the Canadian Association of Paediatric Surgeons, and the Pacific Association of Pediatric Surgeons. The editor-in-chief is G.W. Holcomb III, MD (University of Missouri at Kansas City School of Medicine). According to the Journal Citation Reports, the journal has a 2015 impact factor of 1.733.
