= Biliary atresia =

Absence, blockage, or narrowing of bile ducts in the liver at birth

Extrahepatic biliary atresia
- Other names: Extrahepatic ductopenia
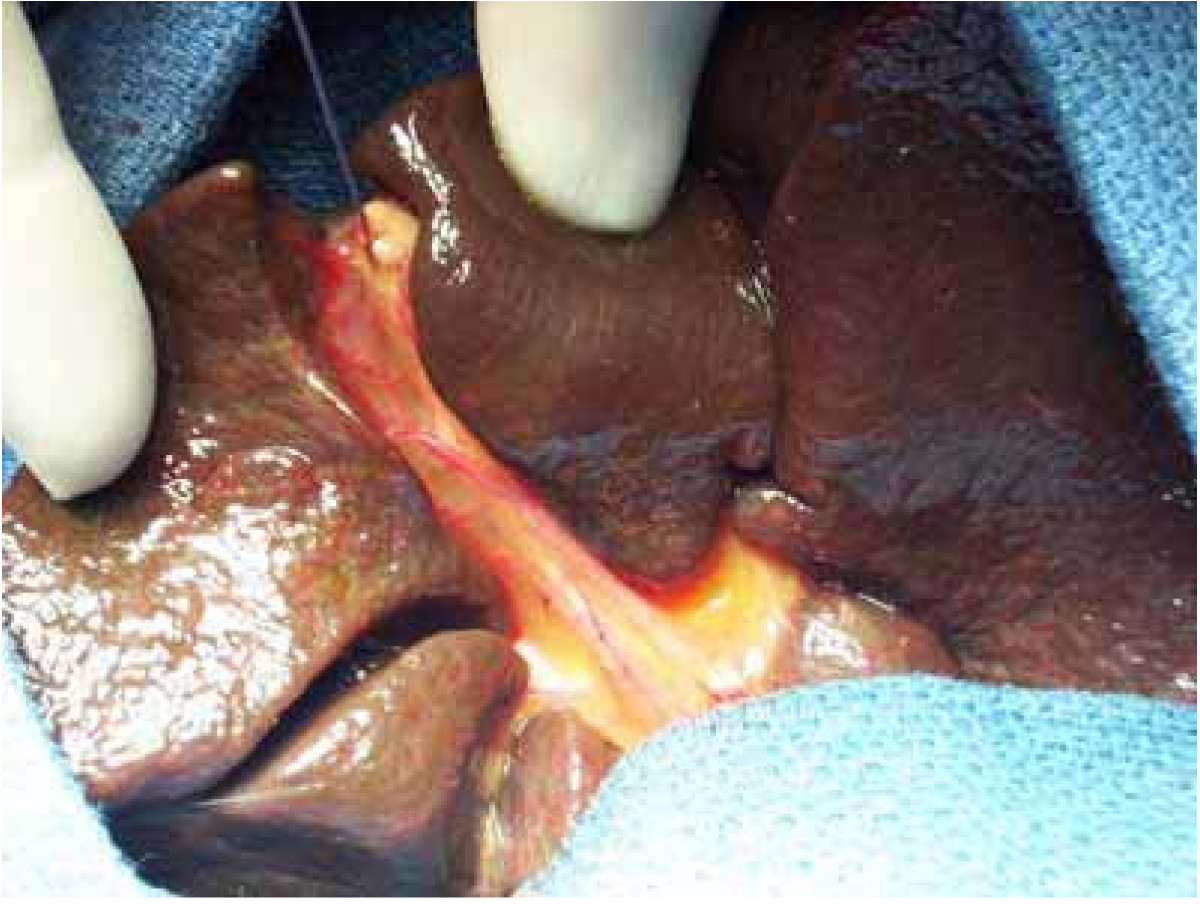
- Intraoperative view of complete extrahepatic biliary atresia
- Specialty: Pediatric surgery
- Symptoms: Jaundice, pale stool, dark urine
- Complications: Cirrhosis, portal hypertension, liver failure
- Usual onset: Infancy
- Types: Congenital, acquired
- Treatment: Surgery, liver transplantation
- Frequency: 1 in 5,000 (East Asia), 1 in 10,000–15,000 (US)

Biliary atresia, also known as extrahepatic ductopenia and progressive obliterative cholangiopathy, is a childhood disease of the liver in which one or more bile ducts are abnormally narrow, blocked, or absent. It can be congenital or acquired. Biliary atresia is the most common reason for pediatric liver transplantation in the United States. It has an incidence of one in 10,000–15,000 live births in the United States, and a prevalence of one in 16,700 in the British Isles. Globally, biliary atresia cases are most common in East Asia, with a frequency of one in 5,000.

A cause of biliary atresia in Egyptian infants has been proven to be as a result of aflatoxin induced cholangiopathy acquired prenatally in infants who have glutathione S transferase M1 deficiency. The biliary atresia phenotype caused by congenital aflatoxicosis in GST M1 deficient neonates is named Kotb disease. Syndromic biliary atresia (e.g. Biliary Atresia Splenic Malformation (BASM)) has been associated with certain genes (e.g. Polycystic Kidney Disease 1 Like 1 - PKD1L1), and some infants with isolated biliary atresia may arise as a result of an autoimmune inflammatory response, possibly due to a viral infection of the liver soon after birth. In animals plant toxins have been shown to cause biliary atresia. The only effective treatments are operations such as the Kasai procedure and liver transplantation.

== Signs and symptoms ==
Initially, the symptoms of biliary atresia are indistinguishable from those of neonatal jaundice, a usually harmless condition commonly seen in infants. However, infants with biliary atresia develop progressive conjugated jaundice, pale white stools, dark urine, and an enlarged palpable liver. Some infants fail to thrive as there will be a degree of fat and fat-soluble vitamin malabsorption (e.g. Vitamin K). This may cause a bleeding tendency. Eventually, and usually after 2 months, cirrhosis with portal hypertension will develop. If left untreated, biliary atresia can lead to liver failure. Unlike other forms of jaundice, however, biliary-atresia-related cholestasis mostly does not result in kernicterus, a form of brain damage resulting from liver dysfunction. This is because in biliary atresia, the liver, although diseased, is still able to conjugate bilirubin, and conjugated bilirubin is unable to cross the blood–brain barrier.

== Causes ==
The cause of biliary atresia in most infants is not fully understood and it is well possible that a number of factors may play a role, but especially maternal rotavirus infection during pregnancy and subsequent transmission of the virus to the child resulting in infection of the biliary epithelium and subsequent occluding fibrosis may be important in this respect. Some cases may relate to infection with other viruses such as SARS-CoV-2, hepatotropic virus reovirus 3, or congenital cytomegalovirus. In addition, autoimmune processes may contribute to pathogenesis in some cases as well. However, with regard to these alternative causation the experimental evidence remains rather weak.

=== Genetics ===
An association between biliary atresia and the ADD3 gene was first detected in Chinese populations through a genome-wide association study, and was confirmed in Thai Asians and Caucasians. A possible association with deletion of the gene GPC1, which encodes a glypican 1-a heparan sulfate proteoglycan, has been reported. This gene is located on the long arm of chromosome 2 (2q37) and is involved in the regulation of inflammation and the Hedgehog gene.

Egyptian infants with biliary atresia were found to have null GSTM1 genotype while all their mothers were heterozygous for GSTM1. Thus these infants may be protected in utero by their maternal detoxification system, yet once born they cannot handle the detoxification of an aflatoxin load.

=== Toxins ===
Some cases of biliary atresia may result from exposure to aflatoxin B1, and to a lesser extent aflatoxin B2 during late pregnancy. Intact maternal detoxification protects baby during intrauterine life, yet after delivery, the baby struggles with the aflatoxin in its blood and liver. Moreover, the baby feeds aflatoxin M_{1} from its mom, as aflatoxin M_{1} is the detoxification product of aflatoxin B1. It is a milder toxin that causes cholangitis in the baby.

There are isolated examples of biliary atresia in animals. For instance, lambs born to sheep grazing on land contaminated with a weed (Red Crumbweed) developed biliary atresia at certain times. The plants were later found to contain a toxin, now called biliatresone. Studies are ongoing to determine whether there is a link between human cases of biliary atresia and toxins such as biliatresone. There are some indications that a metabolite of certain human gut bacteria may be similar to biliatresone.

== Pathophysiology ==
There are three main types of extra-hepatic biliary atresia:

- Type I: Atresia is restricted to the common bile duct.
- Type II: Atresia of the common hepatic duct.
- Type III: Atresia involves the most proximal part of the bile ducts (>95% of all cases).

In approximately 10% of cases, other anomalies may be associated with biliary atresia. The most common of these syndromic forms is BASM and might include heart lesions, polysplenia, situs inversus, absent venae cavae, and a preduodenal portal vein. Progressive cirrhosis is associated with signs and symptoms of portal hypertension, such as esophagogastric varix bleeding, hypersplenism, hepatorenal syndrome, and hepatopulmonary syndrome.

In an Egyptian study, abnormally high levels of aflatoxin B1 and to a lesser extent aflatoxin B2 was found in liver tissue and blood of all neonates with biliary atresia. Aflatoxins may cause extensive damage to the hepatocytes leading to hepatitis and damage to bile ducts causing inflammation, adhesions and final obstruction of bile ducts. The affected neonates have a genetic detoxification defect that does not allow them to detoxify these aflatoxins timely or effectively. The babies have homozygous deficiency of glutathione S transferase (GST) M1. The aflatoxin damaged liver cells and bile duct cells are removed by neutrophil elastase and by involvement of immune system mediators such as CCL-2 or MCP-1, tumor necrosis factor (TNF), interleukin-6 (IL-6), TGF-beta, endothelin (ET), and nitric oxide (NO). Among these, TGF-beta is the most important pro-fibrogenic cytokine that can be seen in progressive cirrhosis.

The cascade of immune involvement to remove damaged hepatocytes and cholangiocytes ushers regeneration. Yet in infants with biliary atresia regeneration is defective, and results in cirrhosis, as these infants have disrupted p53 and disrupted GSTPi. p53 and GSTPi are responsible for DNA fidelity at regeneration. Hence, these infants get accelerated cirrhosis and advance to portal hypertension.

== Diagnosis ==
Diagnosis is made by an assessment of history, physical examination in conjunction with blood tests, a liver biopsy, and ultrasound scans imaging and is prompted by prolonged or persistent jaundice, with abnormalities in liver function tests. Ultrasound or other forms of imaging such as radio-isotope liver scans can also be used but final confirmation is usually only reached at the time of exploratory surgery. Ultrasonography will usually show an absent or abnormal gallbladder.

=== Differential diagnoses ===
The differential diagnoses are extensive and include: Alagille syndrome, alpha-1-antitrypsin deficiency, Byler disease (progressive familial intrahepatic cholestasis), Caroli disease, choledochal cyst, cholestasis, congenital cytomegalovirus disease, congenital herpes simplex virus infection, congenital rubella, congenital syphilis, congenital toxoplasmosis, cystic fibrosis, galactosemia, idiopathic neonatal hepatitis, lipid storage disorders, neonatal hemochromatosis, and total parenteral nutrition-associated cholestasis.

== Treatment ==
Most (>95%) infants with biliary atresia will undergo an operation designed to retain and salvage the native liver, restore bile flow, and reduce the level of jaundice. This is known as the Kasai procedure (after Morio Kasai, the Japanese surgeon who first developed the technique) or hepatoportoenterostomy. Although the procedure is not thought of as curative, it may relieve jaundice and stop liver fibrosis, allowing normal growth and development. Published series from Japan, North America, and the UK show that bilirubin levels will fall to normal values in about 50-55% of infants, allowing 40-50% to retain their own liver to reach the age of 5 and 10 years (and beyond). Liver transplantation is an option for those children whose liver function and symptoms fail to respond to a Kasai operation.

Recent large-scale studies by Davenport et al. (Annals of Surgery, 2008) show that the age of the patient is not an absolute clinical factor affecting prognosis. The influence of age differs according to the disease etiology—i.e., whether biliary atresia is isolated, cystic (CBA), or accompanied by splenic malformation (BASM).

It is widely accepted that corticosteroid treatment after a Kasai operation, with or without choleretics and antibiotics, has a beneficial effect on postoperative bile flow and can clear jaundice, but there is currently no consensus on the ideal dosing and duration of steroid use. Furthermore, it has been observed in many retrospective longitudinal studies that corticosteroid treatment does not seem to significantly prolong survival of the native liver or transplant-free survival.

== Epidemiology ==
Biliary atresia seems to affect females slightly more often than males, and Asians and African Americans more often than Caucasians. It is common for only one child in a pair of twins or within the same family to have the condition. There seems to be no link to medications or immunizations given immediately before or during pregnancy. Diabetes during pregnancy particularly during the first trimester seems to predispose to a number of distinct congenital abnormalities in the infant such as sacral agenesis, transposition of the great vessels and the syndromic form of biliary atresia.
