= Leela Kapila =

British paediatric surgeon

- Born: India
- Education: Royal London Hospital
- Scientific career
- Workplaces: Queen's Medical Centre; Great Ormond Street Hospital; Nottingham University Hospitals NHS Trust

Leela Kapila OBE is a British-Indian surgeon and former consultant paediatric surgeon at the Nottingham University Hospitals NHS Trust. She was awarded the OBE for services to surgery in 1996.

== Early life and education ==
Kapila, a graduate of Christian Medical College Vellore, arrived in the United Kingdom in 1962 and joined the National Health Service. She was encouraged to pursue a surgical career during her medical training, and was the only woman surgical trainee in her region. After completing her surgical exams, she was appointed to the Royal London Hospital, where she tried paediatric surgery for the first time. She eventually trained in paediatric surgery at Great Ormond Street Hospital.

== Research and career ==
In 1974 Kapila was appointed a Consultant surgeon at Queen's Medical Centre. Her early research considered the complications that could result from circumcision, and whether patients were being exposed to an unnecessary operation.

She was appointed Chair of the Royal College of Surgeons of England Women in Surgical Training committee. In an interview with The Guardian she said, "We want the best people in surgery. We can't keep on choosing surgeons from an ever-decreasing pool of men,". She has studied the historical representation of women in paediatric surgery and how the environment for women surgeons had changed.

In 2008 the Royal College of Surgeons of England commissioned a portrait of Kapila by Jane Brettle. On her retirement from medicine a small shrub with cerise flowers was named in her honour. B. ‘Leela Kapila’ is a British cultivar introduced in the Isle of Arran.

== Select publications ==
- N Williams; Kapila, Leela (1993). "Complications of circumcision". British Journal of Surgery. 80 (10): 1231–1236. doi:10.1002/bjs.1800801005. PMID 8242285. Wikidata Q61772544.
- Nigel Williams; Julian Chell; Kapila, Leela (1993). "Why are children referred for circumcision?". The BMJ. 306 (6869): 28. doi:10.1136/bmj.306.6869.28. PMC 1676352. PMID 8435573. Wikidata Q40336138.
- M. C. Foster; Kapila, Leela; D. L. Morris; R. C. B. Slack (1986). "A randomized comparative study of sulbactam plus ampicillin vs. metronidazole plus cefotaxime in the management of acute appendicitis in children". Reviews of Infectious Diseases. 8 Suppl 5: S634-8. doi:10.1093/clinids/8.supplement_5.s634. PMID 3026017. Wikidata Q70159419.
