= Conrad Ramstedt =

German surgeon (1867–1963)

- Born: 1 February 1867; Hamersleben, Province of Saxony, Kingdom of Prussia
- Died: 7 February 1963 (aged 96); Münster, West Germany
- Education: Heidelberg University; University of Berlin; University of Halle
- Years active: 1895–1947
- Known for: Ramstedt's operation
- Medical career
- Profession: Surgeon
- Institutions: RafaelKlinik, Münster
- Awards: Order of Merit of the Federal Republic of Germany, 1957

Wilhelm Conrad Ramstedt (1 February 1867 – 7 February 1963) was a German surgeon remembered for describing Ramstedt's operation.

== Biography ==
Conrad Ramstedt was born in 1867 in Hamersleben, Province of Saxony, Prussia (now Saxony-Anhalt, Germany), the son of physician Constantin Ramstedt. He was educated at the gymnasium in Magdeburg before studying medicine at Heidelberg, Berlin and finally Halle from where he qualified in 1894. He became assistant in the University Surgical Clinic in Halle under Fritz Gustav von Bramann from 1895 to 1901. In 1901 he joined the German Army as a medical officer in the Westphalian Cuirassiers, serving until 1909. On his discharge from the Army, he became chief surgeon to the RafaelKlinik in Münster, a position he held until 1947. During World War I he served as Oberstabsarzt (Major) in the German Army. In 1911 he performed the first Ramstedt operation, and published six papers on the subject between 1912 and 1934. In 1957 he received the Order of Merit of the Federal Republic of Germany. He continued operating until the age of 80 when he was stopped by failing eyesight; he died at the age of 96 in Münster.

== Ramstedt's operation ==
Infantile hypertrophic pyloric stenosis was first fully described by Harald Hirschsprung in 1888. Initially surgeons were reluctant to advise surgical intervention in these cases, even though mortality from the condition was high, as the mortality rate from surgery was also very high. Pyloric dilatation and pyloroplasty were tried with little success. Some surgeons found better results with gastroenterostomy to bypass the obstructed pylorus. On 23 August 1911 Ramstedt operated on the first case of pyloric stenosis he had seen. He had decided to perform a pyloroplasty, which involved incising the pyloric muscle longitudinally and then closing the defect by suturing the muscle back together transversely. He performed the longitudinal incision, relieving the obstruction, but found that the sutures tore out through the muscle when he attempted to close the incision. He elected to cover the defect with an omental patch, realising that it was not necessary to suture the pyloric muscle. This procedure, incising the pyloric muscle while leaving the mucosa intact and leaving the muscle to heal, was the first pyloromyotomy to be performed and became known as Ramstedt's operation. Ramstedt performed a second pyloromyotomy in 1912, and did not use an omental patch on the second occasion. Both children recovered well, and Ramstedt reported the new procedure in September 1912.
