= Hepatoportoenterostomy =

Type of surgerical treatment

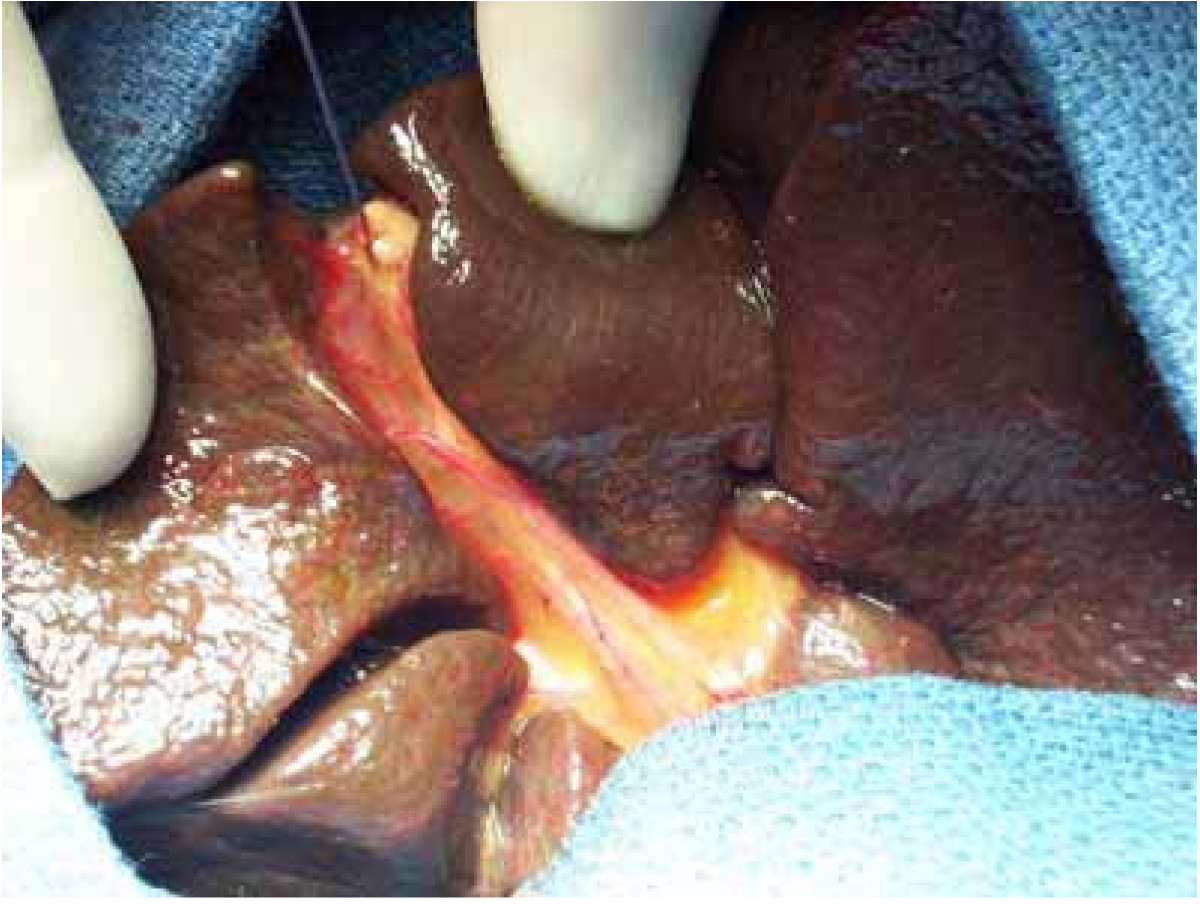
- Intraoperative view of complete biliary atresia.
- Other names: Kasai procedure Kasai portoenterostomy Biliary atresia surgery Biliary atresia operation
- ICD-10-PCS: 0F194ZB
- ICD-9-CM: 51.37

A hepatoportoenterostomy or the Kasai procedure is a surgical treatment performed on infants with Type IVb choledochal cyst and biliary atresia to allow for bile drainage. In these infants, the bile is not able to drain normally from the small bile ducts within the liver into the larger bile ducts that connect to the gall bladder and small intestine.

== Procedure ==
The surgery involves exposing the porta hepatis (the area of the liver from which bile should drain) by radical excision of all bile duct tissue up to the liver capsule and attaching a Roux-en-Y loop of jejunum to the exposed liver capsule above the bifurcation of the portal vein creating a portoenterostomy. The rationale for this approach is that minute residual bile duct remnants may be present in the fibrous tissue of the porta hepatis and thus provide direct connection with the intrahepatic ductule system to allow bile drainage.

This procedure was developed in 1951 by Japanese biliary and hepatic pediatric surgeon Morio Kasai (1922–2008).

== Prognosis ==
Prognosis of this condition/procedure comprises the following:

- If performed before 60 days of age, 80% of children achieve some bile drainage
- Prognosis is progressively worse the later surgery is done
- Post-operatively, cholangitis and malabsorption are common
- Many children with biliary atresia will require liver transplantation despite the attempted surgical repair, although on occasion, it can be delayed until adulthood.

== See also ==
- List of surgeries by type
