= Robert Edward Gross =

American surgeon and medical researcher

Robert Edward Gross (July 2, 1905 – October 11, 1988) was an American surgeon and a medical researcher. He performed early work in pediatric heart surgery at Boston Children's Hospital. Gross was president of the American Association for Thoracic Surgery, a member of the National Academy of Sciences and a fellow of the American Academy of Arts and Sciences.

== Biography ==
The National Academies Press called him "one of America's great pioneers of surgery". The New York Times said that he did "pioneering work in the field of cardiac surgery". According to his obituary in The New York Times, in 1938 Gross "performed the first surgical correction of one of the most common congenital heart disorders in children", referring to the ligation of the patent ductus. Ten years later he performed the first surgery to graft artery tissue from one person into another, thus making a leap in methods of repairing of damaged arteries. He also developed a method of cutting into a heart with a use of a plastic well that allowed to avoid a catastrophic loss of blood. Gross was a member of the National Academy of Sciences. He was also Surgeon-in-chief, cardiovascular surgery, Children's Hospital, Boston. Gross was a founder of the American Board of Surgery and the American Board of Thoracic Surgery. He also was a fellow of the American Academy of Arts and Sciences, a board member of the American Academy of Pediatrics and a member of the American Association for the Advancement of Science and the Society of University Surgeons. In 1941 he coauthored "Abdominal Surgery of Infancy and Childhood" with William E Ladd. The book is considered a classic in surgical literature. He was the first president of the American Pediatric Surgical Association. Gross was elected to the American Pediatric Hall of Fame. The National Academies Press said that he "made many contributions that have altered the practice and understanding of surgery, pediatrics, and cardiology throughout the world".

== Awards and distinctions ==
- 1951 - honorary D.Sc., Carleton College
- 1959 - M.D., Honoris Causa, Louvain University
- 1961 - M.D., Honoris Causa, Turin University
- 1962 - honorary D.Sc., Suffolk University
- 1963 - honorary D.Sc., University of Sheffield
- 1984 - honorary D.Sc., Harvard University
- 1953 - Honorary member, Reno Surgical Society
- 1955 - Honorary member, Dallas Southern Clinical Society
- 1956 - Honorary member, Buffalo Surgical Society
- 1958 - Honorary appointment, American National Red Cross, North Shore chapter
- 1961 - Honorary fellow, Spokane Surgical Society
- 1967 - Honorary citation, Barnstable County chapter, Massachusetts Heart Association
- 1959 - Officer of the Order of Leopold, Belgium
- 1959 - Honorary officer of the International Red Cross, Belgium
- 1960 - Honorary member, Pediatric Society of Guatemala
- 1964 - Honorary member, La Bocedad de Cirurgia Pediatrica de Mexico
- 1968 - Honorary member, Surgical Infantil Argentina Society
- 1973 - Honorary fellow, Royal College of Surgeons of England
- 1954-55 - Director, American Heart Association
- 1958-60 - Director, American Heart Association
- 1960 President, Massachusetts Heart Association
- 1963-64 President, American Association for Thoracic Surgery
- 1969-70 Board of directors, Massachusetts Heart Association
- 1970-71 First president, American Pediatric Surgical Association
- 1940 - E. Mead Johnson Award, American Academy of Pediatrics
- 1940 - Rudolf Matas Vascular Surgery Award, Tulane University
- 1954 - Children's Service Award, Toy Manufacturers of America
- 1954 - Albert Lasker Award, American Public Health Association
- 1956 - Roswell Park Gold Medal, Buffalo Surgical Society
- 1957 - Gold Medal, Louisville Surgical Society
- 1959 - Laeken Award, Brussels, Belgium
- 1959 - Gold Medal, Detroit Surgical Association
- 1959 - Albert Lasker Award, American Public Health Association
- 1959 - Billroth Medal, New York Academy of Medicine
- 1961 - Gold Medal Award, Golden Slipper Square Club of Philadelphia
- 1962 - Award of the Brotherhood Temple Ohabei Shalom, Brookline
- 1965 - William E. Ladd Medal Award, Surgical Section, American Academy of Pediatrics
- 1965 - Gold Cross, Royal Order of the Phoenix of the Greek Government
- 1968 - Denis Browne Gold Medal, British Association of Pediatric Surgeons
- 1969 - Dr. Rodman E. Sheen and Thomas G. Sheen Award, American Medical Association
- 1970 - Alfred Jurzykowski Medalist, New York Academy of Medicine citation with Farber and Neuhauser and the Children's Hospital Medical Center
- 1970 - Henry Jacob Bigelow Memorial Medal
- 1971 - Tina Award
- 1973 - Distinguished Service Medal, American Surgical Association

== Education and career ==
- 1927 - B.A., Carleton College
- 1931 - M.D., Harvard University, Medical School
- 1934-36, Instructor in pathology, Harvard Medical School
- 1937-39, Instructor in surgery, Harvard Medical School
- 1939-40, Junior associate in surgery, Peter Bent Brigham Hospital
- 1939-42, Associate in surgery, Harvard Medical School
- 1939-46, Associate visiting surgeon, Children's Hospital, Boston
- 1940-46, Senior associate in surgery, Peter Bent Brigham Hospital
- 1942-47, Assistant professor of surgery, Harvard Medical School
- 1947-88, Ladd Professor of Children's Surgery, Harvard Medical School
- 1947-67, Surgeon-in-chief, Children's Hospital, Boston
- 1952, Surgeon-in-chief, pro-tempore, Ohio State University
- 1967-72, Surgeon-in-chief, cardiovascular surgery, Children's Hospital, Boston
