= British Association of Paediatric Surgeons =

- Formation: 1953
- Website: Official website

The British Association of Paediatric Surgeons (BAPS) is a registered charity that aims to advance the study and practice of paediatric surgery.

== The organisation ==
The organisation was founded in the UK 1953 and included oversees members. The idea for the group came up when a group of four British surgeons - Denis Browne, Robert Zachary, David Waterston and Peter Rickham - attended a meeting of the American Academy of Pediatrics the year before. At the time, there were only a few dozen known paediatric surgeons across the world, so they were all invited to join BAPS. Its first meeting was held in 1954.

== Aims ==
Aims of the Society have been listed as to the advance the study, practice, and research in child surgery, to promote the teaching of surgery in children, both under-graduate and post-graduate, and advise on the training of paediatric surgeons, advice on matters concerning the children surgical services in the British Isles, and to the promote friendship with overseas paediatric surgeons.

== Founding members ==
- Denis Browne (surgeon), Great Ormond Street Hospital in London
- Valentine Swain, Queen Elizabeth Hospital for Children in Hackney.
- JJ Mason Browne, Royal Hospital for Sick Children, Glasgow
- Wallace Denison, RHSC, Glasgow
- Isabella Forshall, Alder Hey Children's Hospital, Liverpool
- Peter Paul Rickham, Alder Hey Children's Hospital, Liverpool
- Robert Zachary, Sheffield
- Ambrose Jolleys, Manchester
- John Scott, Newcastle
- David Waterston

== Affiliations ==
BAPS is one of several national paediatric surgical organisations affiliated with the Journal of Pediatric Surgery. The organisation awards the Denis Browne Gold Medal to recognize outstanding achievement in the field. The award is named for Sir Denis Browne, the first president of the association. The first award, given in 1968, went to surgeon Robert Edward Gross.
