= American Pediatric Surgical Association =

American pediatric surgery organization

- Location: One Parkview Plaza, Suite 800, Oakbrook Terrace, IL, 60181
- Members: >1,200 (2015)
- President: Mary Fallat
- Secretary: John H.T. Waldhausen
- Publication: Journal of Pediatric Surgery
- Website: apsapedsurg.org

The American Pediatric Surgical Association is an American professional organization dedicated to pediatric surgery. It was established in 1970 and had over 1,200 members as of 2015. Its official journal is the Journal of Pediatric Surgery.
