= Marcelo Martinez-Ferro =

Argentine pediatric surgeon

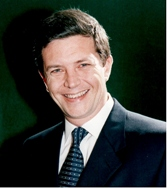
Image of MartinezFerro

Marcelo Martinez-Ferro is an Argentinian pediatric surgeon specializing in fetal, neonatal, and thoracic surgery. He also developed a non-surgical treatment for pectus carinatum, which has been adopted in several countries, treating over 20,000 patients. Additionally, he is a board member of the Chest Wall International Group.

== Biography ==
Marcelo Martinez-Ferro was born in Buenos Aires and graduated from the Buenos Aires University School of Medicine in 1983. He completed his residency in pediatric surgery at the Ricardo Gutierrez Children´s Hospital and in 1988, joined the staff of Garrahan national Children`s Hospital. In 1992 he completed a fellowship at the Fetal Treatment Center of the UCSF where he confirmed his interest in fetal treatment and video surgery.

In 2001, Martinez-Ferro, along with the Surgical and Obstetrical Team of CEMIC (a medical center in Buenos Aires), performed the first fetal surgery in Argentina on a patient with myelomeningocele to prevent the consequences of amniotic fluid contact with the spinal cord in the maternal uterus; this was the first such intervention to be performed outside of the United States.

Furthermore, he is the inventor of a non-surgical dynamic compression treatment to correct pectus carinatum (keel chest), which has been used by more than 20,000 patients worldwide. Another precedent for an orthotic treatment for this condition was developed by Brazilian physician Sydney Haje and his team. These treatments are currently preferred over the surgical procedure of Mark Ravitch due to their less invasive nature.

He is a member of the editorial board of the Journal of Pediatric Surgery. He also serves on the editorial boards of other journals indexed in Index Medicus, such as Fetal Diagnosis and Therapy and the Journal of Laparoendoscopic and Advanced Surgical Techniques.

He is a past-president of the International Pediatric Endosurgery Group.

== Work on fetal, neonatal, and thoracic surgery ==
Martinez-Ferro with Drs. Santiago Lippold and Aldo Vizcaino, under the coordination of Dr. Michael Harrison, established the Fetal Surgery Program at CEMIC, the first of its kind in Latin America. The program's purpose was to optimize the chain of diagnosis, evaluation, and medical treatments during gestation, as well as the referral of newborn patients, to reduce the morbidity and mortality rates from congenital defects such as pulmonary malformations, urinary tract obstructions, and diaphragmatic hernias.

In this regard, in May 2001, they performed the first in utero surgery outside of the United States. The objective of the 'open' fetal surgical intervention was to correct a spinal cord malformation known as myelomeningocele, to prevent the future consequences of amniotic fluid contact with the spinal cord in the maternal uterus.

A pioneer in the implementation of laparoscopic and thoracoscopic procedures in newborns and children, Dr. Martinez-Ferro has contributed to improving surgical outcomes and reducing the invasiveness of surgical procedures.

He is a co-author of three speciality books. The first, Neonatología Quirúrgica (Surgical Neonatology), was published in 2004, with its second edition released a year later. In 2018, he published Fetoneonatología Quirúrgica (Feto-Neonatal Surgery) with Editorial Journal, a two-volume specialized work: "Clinical Aspects" and "Technical Aspects." He introduced the term "Feto-neonatology" to address the medical and surgical care of the fetus and the newborn with an emphasis on establishing a continuous process, that is, not separated by the moment of birth.

Furthermore, he has specialized in the surgical and non-surgical treatment of thoracic malformations such as pectus carinatum, pectus excavatum, and Poland syndrome, with a focus on reducing invasiveness and correcting the cardiac and pulmonary function of patients, in addition to the impact on patients' self-esteem.

In relation to this, together with Dr. Carlos Fraire, he introduced the Nuss procedure in Latin America for the correction of pectus excavatum (the sinking of the sternum towards the spine).

Over the years, he and his team incorporated various updates to the procedure, such as 3D surgical planning and the personalization of implant systems; the creation of specific cardiopectus indices and studies; and the application of cryoanalgesia for postoperative pain reduction.

Martinez-Ferro founded the Grupo de Cirugía Pediátrica (Pediatric Surgery Group), an association of surgeons from various pediatric specialities dedicated to the reception and collaboration on complex cases. As part of this initiative, Clínica Mi Pectus (My Pectus Clinic) was established, specializing in the research and treatment of chest wall malformations, with a multidisciplinary and comprehensive approach. He currently continues to contribute to both organizations as a consultant and scientific researcher.

== Dynamic Compressor FMF System for Pectus Carinatum Correction ==
Martinez-Ferro invented the Dynamic Compressor FMF System as a non-invasive alternative for correcting pectus carinatum. The "FMF System" operates on the principle that the chest wall, particularly in children and adolescents, is malleable and can be reshaped by applying external pressure.

This orthopaedic system, manufactured by Pampamed, is made from ultralight aluminium and custom-made for each patient. It works by applying gradual and controlled pressure, correcting the deformity over several months.

Between 2001 and 2007, Martinez-Ferro's team used this dynamic compression system, which includes a correction pressure gauge, to treat 208 patients with pectus carinatum non-invasively. The effectiveness rate was 90%. A key differentiator of this system is its ability to measure the patient's chest elasticity and adjust the correction pressure accordingly. This improves accuracy, optimizes treatment duration, and helps prevent skin lesions.

The Children's Hospital of The King's Daughters in the United States was the first international centre to adopt this system, positioning it as the preferred global treatment over surgical intervention for this condition. Treatment alternatives for chest wall malformations have evolved from open resections to minimally invasive strategies, and now, to reshaping the chest using both surgical and non-surgical methods.
