= Pectus =

Pectus may refer to:

- the part of the torso between the neck and the diaphragm
- colloquially, the word is also used for certain deformations of the pectus such as:
  - Pectus excavatum, an abnormally concave chest
  - Pectus carinatum, an abnormally convex chest

== See also ==
- Pectis, a genus of flowering plants in the daisy family
