= King-Denborough syndrome =

Genetic, non-dystrophic myopathy

King-Denborough syndrome (KDS; also known as Koussef-Nichols syndrome, King syndrome, and Noonan-like contracture myopathy hyperpyrexia syndrome) is a rare, genetic, non-dystrophic myopathy characterized by distinct skeletal and facial dysmorphic features, short stature, and a high risk of developing malignant hyperthermia (MH) when undergoing general anaesthesia with volatile anesthetics or succinylcholine. There is a wide phenotypic presentation, such as delayed motor development; muscle weakness; easy fatigability; ptosis; facies myopathica (characteristic facial features associated with muscle weakness); skeletal abnormalities such as short stature, kyphosis, scoliosis, lumbar lordosis, pectus carinatum, and pectus excavatum; dysmorphic facial features such as hypertelorism, ptosis, downslanting palpebral fissures, epicanthic folds, low-set ears, and micrognathism; webbed neck; cryptorchidism; and a susceptibility to rhabdomyolysis from intense physical activity, viral infections, and statin use.

KDS was first described formally in 1973 by John Owen King and Michael Antony Denborough, two physicians working at the University of Melbourne and the Royal Melbourne Hospital. The two noticed similar characteristics among several children while reviewing cases of MH, then known as malignant hyperpyrexia.

Treatment is largely supportive, though patients with KDS should not receive volatile anesthetics nor succinylcholine if requiring general anesthesia due to the high risk of developing MH.

KDS is linked to various mutations in the RYR1 gene, encoding for the skeletal muscle ryanodine receptor 1. Mutations in the RYR1 gene have been implicated in other syndromes associated with MH such as central core disease. An exact prevalence of KDS is not known, though it is likely less than 1 in one million.
