= Sydney Haje =

Brazilian orthopedist

Sydney Abrão Haje (16 February 1952 – 26 June 2012) was a Brazilian orthopedist, known internationally for his pioneering work on chest wall deformities including the creation of a conservative treatment protocol for the pectus carinatum and pectus excavatum conditions.

He also was the medical director of the Centro Clínico Orthopectus and Pediatric Orthopaedics instructor in Brasília, Brazil, and scientific and continuing medical education director of the Medical Association of Brasília (AMBr).

== Life and work ==
Born in Anápolis in the state of Goiás, Brazil in 1952, Haje moved to Brasília in 1969. He graduated in medicine in 1976 from the University of Brasília (UnB), performed his orthopedic residency at the Hospital Sarah, and completed a further specialization in physiatry.

Starting in 1977, Haje developed the "dynamic remodeling method", a treatment of chest wall deformities pectus carinatum and pectus excavatum based on the use of compression braces in association with exercise protocols, and he continued working in this medical field for the next 35 years, treating close to 5.000 patients. He highlighted that here are time points at which patients should best be treated due to the decreasing flexibility of the thorax during the course of development, – with patients with pectus carinatum being best treated in childhood, and patients with pectus excavatum best treated in the growing period. He gave the first description of a case of iatrogenic pectus deformity due to the injury of these growth plates in connection with a cardiac operation in which a sternotomy was performed on the immature skeleton.

During a fellowship in the United States, he pioneered the reproduction of pectus deformities in animal experiments, as a step towards understanding, preventing and treating pectus deformities. These experiments confirmed the presence of growth plates in the sternum and not, as previously described, sutures between sternal segments. At the Alfred I. duPont Institute, a pediatric orthopedic hospital in Wilmington, Delaware in the United States, he treated children and adolescents with different types of pectus deformities with a dynamic chest compressor orthosis.

In 1995 Haje put in place a treatment program that allowed patients to receive his orthoses without cost in public hospitals in Brasília. Together with his co-workers, he also investigated the development of pectus deformities in relation to the growth of the sternum, using magnetic resonance image data in combination with radiographic data.

After the Nuss procedure for pectus excavatum had drawn worldwide attention to the elasticity and malleability of the chest wall in children, several groups including that of Argentinian surgeon Marcelo Martinez-Ferro started working with pectus carinatum patients using compression braces. Until this time, except for the pioneer papers of Haje and coworkers, no other medical authors had supported a non-operative approach for the treatment of these patients.

Haje taught and lectured in Brazil and internationally, including the United Kingdom, Argentina and Turkey. on the occasion of a lecture to be held by Haje at the Royal Society of Medicine in 2011, a spinal surgeon from the UK, David Harrison, introduced Haje's work by referring to it as "truly revolutionary" and "much more appropriate to the way in which we would like to treat pectus carinatum and excavatum deformities, something that we have not been able to do before", emphasizing also the psychosocial relevance of these conditions.

Haje authored over 20 scientific publications and received seven awards for his studies.

He died on 25 June 2012 of a heart attack. His work is continued by his son Davi P. Haje.
