= Haller index =

Medical ratio

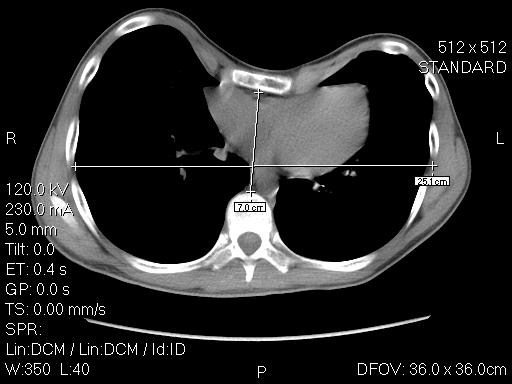
A CT scan showing a 3.58 index

The Haller index, created in 1987 by J. Alex Haller, S. S. Kramer, and S. A. Lietman, is a mathematical relationship that exists in a human chest section observed with a CT scan. It is defined as the ratio of the transverse diameter (the horizontal distance of the inside of the ribcage) and the anteroposterior diameter (the shortest distance between the vertebrae and sternum).

$$\ HI = \frac {\text{distance 1}}{\text{distance 2}}$$

where:

HI is the Haller Index
distance 1 is the distance of the inside ribcage (at the level of maximum deformity or at the lower third of the sternum)
distance 2 is the distance between the sternal notch and vertebrae.

More recent studies show that simple chest x-rays are just as effective as CT scans for calculating the Haller index and recommend replacing CT scans with CXR to reduce radiation exposure in all but gross deformities.

A normal Haller index should be about 2.5. Chest wall deformities such as pectus excavatum can cause the sternum to invert, thus increasing the index. In severe asymmetric cases, where the sternum dips below the level of the vertebra, the index can be a negative value.

== See also ==
- Pectus carinatum
- Nuss procedure
