= Galler =

Galler is a surname of German and Anglo-Norman French origin and a common name of Jewish families in Poland, Israel, and the United States. It is estimated that fewer than 4,000 individuals have this name worldwide. The name is also found as Galier, Gallier, Galor, Galer, and Gal-Or. It may also be a Russian language rendering of the surname Haller.

Notable people with this surname include:

- Bernard Galler (1928–2006), American mathematician and computer scientist
- Bruno Galler (born 1946), Swiss football referee
- Lev Galler (1883–1950), Russian military leader

== German surname ==
Galler is one of the rarest German surnames, occurring mainly in Germany (90%), the United States Of America (3%), and Switzerland (7%). Its origins predate medieval times in Germany. The first known mention of this name was in Nürburg (a tribal area), during the Holy Roman Empire. It would be classified as a protestant name, although it predates the Protestant Reformation. People associated with St. Gallen in Switzerland are also called gallers.

== Anglo-Norman French surname ==
Galler is from the Old French "galure" or "galier", a coxcomb or spark, usually given to someone who was happy, good-humored, or of pleasant temperament. The Old French is a form of Waller, which derives from the Anglo-Norman French Wallier. The name may also derive from the nickname Galliard, meaning bold or joyous.

== Jewish family name ==
Galler is a common name of Jewish families who lived in Poland for hundreds of years prior to 1942 and who currently live in Israel and the United States. Examples in Poland: Lipa [Lippa] Galler, Benjamin Galler, Abraham Galler, David Galler, and Israel Galler. In Israel: Benjamin Galler, Gadi Galler, Dan Galler, Tzvi Galler, and Offer Galler. Some of the Gallers in Israel have changed their name to Galor, Gal-or and Gal, like Amir Gal-Or, Benjamin Gal-Or, Gillad Galor, Talia Gal-Or, Raz Gal-Or, Amit Gal-Or, Gonen Galor, Ariel Galor, Esther Gal-Or, and Naomi Gal-Or.

German archives estimates that only about 3,800+ people bear the surname Galler worldwide.

== See also ==
- Galor (surname)
- Gallier
- Galler-Rabinowitz, American ice dancer
- Amir Gal-Or (born 1962), Israeli entrepreneur
- Katharina Galor (fl. 2000s), Israeli archaeologist
- Oded Galor (fl. c. 1900s), Israeli economist & academic
