= Galor =

Galor may refer to:

- Galor (surname)

== See also ==
- Galor, fictional starship of Cardassian Galor class in Star Trek franchise
