= Haller =

Haller is a surname of English and German origin. Notable people and characters with the surname include:

- Albin Haller (1849–1925), French chemist
- Albrecht von Haller (1708–1777), Swiss anatomist and physiologist, also notable for his contributions to botany
- Barbara Haller, German curler
- Benoît Haller (born 1972), French baroque singer and conductor of La Chapelle Rhénane
- Berthold Haller (c. 1492–1536), Swiss educator, preacher and church reformer
- Beth A. Haller (born 1961), professor of mass communication and communication studies at Towson University
- Christina Haller (born 1968), German female curler
- Daniel Haller (1929–2024), American film and television director, production designer and art director
- David Charles Haller, character in the Marvel Comics universe
- Frank Haller (1883–1939), American boxer
- Gert Haller (1944–2010), German manager
- Gottlieb Emmanuel von Haller (1735–1786), botanist, son of Albrecht von Haller senior
- Granville O. Haller (1819–1897), American Civil War officer and Seattle businessman
- Harry Haller, the subject of Hermann Hesse's novel Steppenwolf
- Helmut Haller (1939–2012), West German footballer
- Henry Haller (1923–2020), Swiss-American chef
- J. Alex Haller (1927–2018), American surgeon
- Johann Haller (1463–1525), Polish printer
- Johannes Evangelist Haller (1825–1900), Archbishop of Salzburg
- Jost Haller (fl. 1440–1470), Alsatian painter
- Józef Haller (1873–1960), Polish general
- Julia Haller, American ophthalmologist
- Karl Ludwig von Haller (1768–1854), Swiss jurist and author
- Kevin Haller (born 1970), Canadian hockey player
- Martin Haller (1835–1925), German architect, member of the Hamburg Parliament
- Martin Haller (politician) (born 1983), German politician
- Nicolaus Ferdinand Haller (1805–1876), German politician
- Paul Haller British roshi, Buddhist teacher and abbot
- Rene Haller (born 1933), Swiss naturalist
- Rudolf Haller (1929–2014), Austrian philosopher
- Salomé Haller, French opera singer
- Sébastien Haller (born 1994), Ivorian footballer
- Stanisław Haller (1872–1940), Polish general, Józef's cousin
- Theodore N. Haller (1864–1930), Seattle businessman and son of G. O. Haller
- Tom Haller (1937–2004), American baseball player
- Wilhelm Haller (1935–2004), South German businessman and social entrepreneur

== See also ==
- Galler
- Haller von Hallerstein, German and Hungarian noble family
- Haller index, devised by J. Alex Haller and others
- Haller, Luxembourg, a town in eastern Luxembourg
- Haller, a river in Lower Saxony, Germany
- Haller Lake, lake and neighborhood near Seattle, Washington
- Heller (disambiguation)
