= Josip Šišković =

Habsburg military officer (1719–1783)

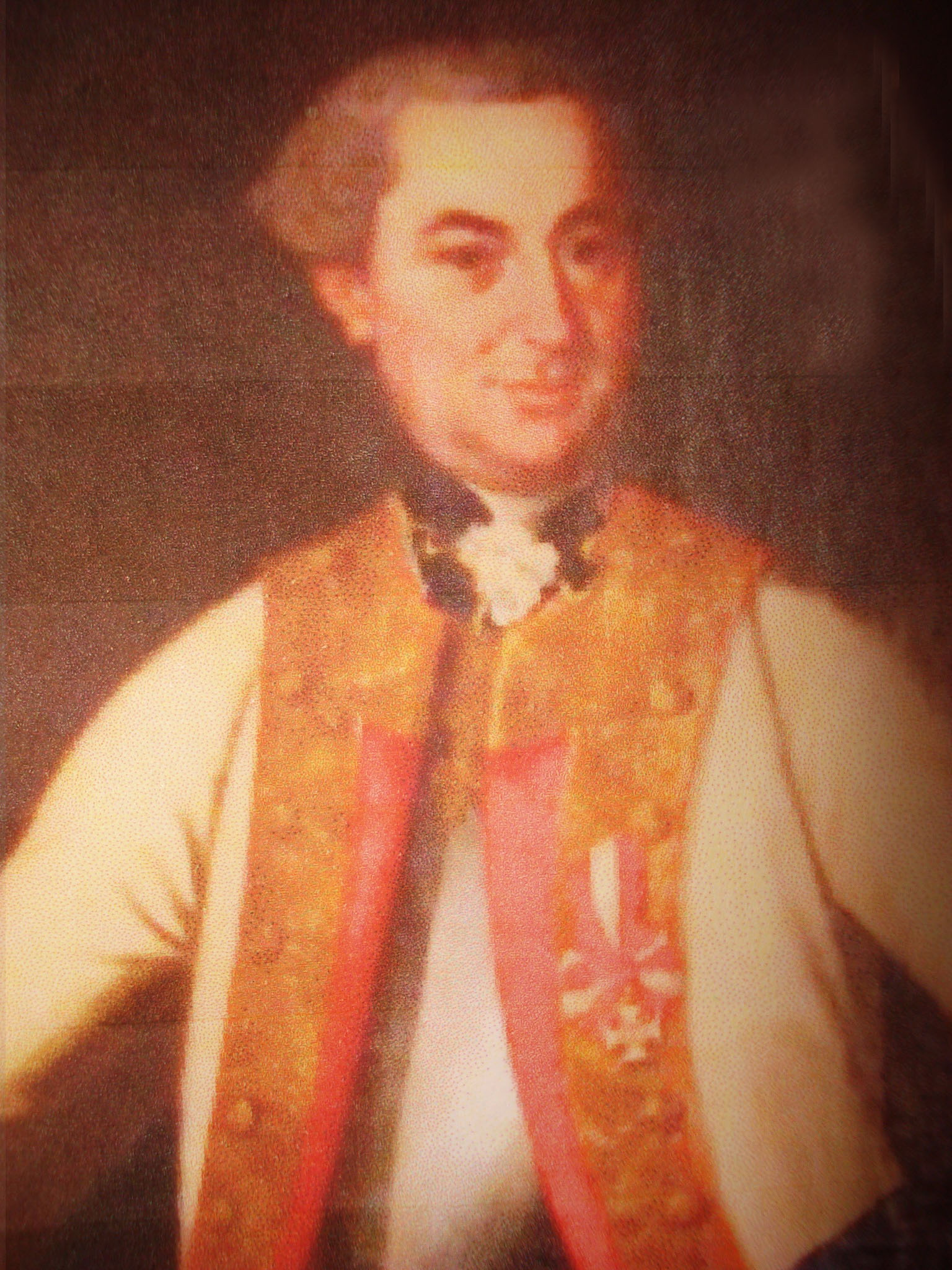

Josip Šišković (in foreign sources: József Siskovics; Josef Siskowitz; Joseph Siskovich; 2 July 1719 – February 4, 1783) was a Habsburg senior military officer and official of Croatian origin, a member of the Šišković noble family residing in Bačka. He held the rank of artillery general of the imperial army of the Habsburg monarchy and the title of count. In over forty years of his career, he participated in the many battles and wars waged by the Monarchy during the 18th century. In them he distinguished himself with exceptional knowledge, ability and courage, so he received a number of decorations for his merits, including the Knight's Cross of the Military Order of Maria Theresa (1758) and the Commander's Cross of the same Order (1765). He also received political and government appointments.

== Origin and family ==
According to available sources, Josip Count Šišković was born on 2 July 1719 in Szeged in southern Hungary (then the Kingdom of Hungary as part of the Habsburg monarchy), into a wealthy family of Bunjevci Roman Catholics . His parents were Andrija (Hungarian: András) Šišković, city councilor (senator), and Marija (Mária) Šišković, née Šarec (Hungarian Sárecz, sometimes Sáracs, Sáracz, Seraty or similar). He was the youngest child in a large family, having two more brothers and 4 sisters. He married relatively late (9 January 1759), at the age of forty to Baroness Barbara Harruckern (born 19 November 1739). There were no children in that marriage.

== Military career ==
He joined the Habsburg Imperial Army at the age of nineteen, and at the beginning of the War of the Austrian Succession (1740–1748) he was part of the newly-formed so-called Haller's infantry. His battalion was sent in May 1742 to the territory of present-day Slovakia, to the area of the towns of Košice, Levoča and Prešov. In July of the same year, she was transferred to Petrovaradin in Srijem. Already in 1742, Šišković received the rank of captain.

In the spring of 1744 his battalion was on the battlefields of Bavaria, and in 1745 it was stationed in Vienna. On 19 December 1745, Josip Šišković was promoted to major, and his unit was then sent back to Petrovaradin. However, he soon embarked on a long journey to the Netherlands, where he arrived in mid-April 1745. For the next two years, the battalion took part in battles against the French and Prussians in northwestern Europe (e.g., the Battle of Roucoux, the Battle of Lauffeldt, etc.). At the end of 1748, the battalion returned from the northwest and stationed in the garrison in Prague.

== Rapid advancement in the hierarchy ==
As a young officer, Šišković made rapid progress in the military hierarchy. Thus, on 31 December 1750, at the age of 32, he became a colonel. A few years later, on 15 March 1756, he was given the title of baron.

At the beginning of the Seven Years' War (1756–1763), he was particularly prominent in the Battle of Kolin in Central Bohemia, in which his regiment repulsed five fierce consecutive attacks by the Prussian army on 18 June 1757, and in which Šišković was severely wounded but in the end the Habsburg army took the victory. He himself was immediately promoted to the rank of general, more precisely General feldwachtmeister (GFWM), and awarded the Knight's Cross of the Military Order of Maria Theresa. The decoration was solemnly awarded to him at the 2nd Promotion on 1 August 1758, and he was the only officer to receive the decoration at that promotion. He is also the first officer of Croatian origin (but who was not born in Croatia), who was ever awarded the Military Order of Maria Theresa, and behind him succeeded the brilliant General Josip Kazimir Drašković, the first Croat born in Croatia.

In 1758, Šišković became commander of the grenadiers and took part in numerous battles against the Prussians in Moravia and Saxony (e.g. the battle of Domstadtl, the battle of Hochkirch, etc.). In the battle of Hochkirch, he was again severely wounded and transferred to a Field hospital, where he later managed to recover.

At the age of forty, on 9 November 1759, Josip Šišković was promoted to the rank of lieutenant marshal (Feldmarschalleutnant - FML), and in 1760 he was appointed chief of staff of field marshal Leopold Joseph von Daun, and remained so until the end of the Seven Years' War. In the meantime (1762) he became the "owner" (Inhaber) of a hunting infantry regiment (number 37), which was renamed the Šišković Infantry Regiment. In 1763 he was appointed a member of the Court War Council, and soon after that he was sent as a military-political commissioner to Erdelj (Transylvania), where there was a revolt of the Sikulci (Sekelj), the Hungarian national minority in the area. The rebellion was suffocated in blood in early 1764, and became known in history as Siculicidium (Siculicid).

At the 10th promotion, held on 15 October 1765, Šišković was awarded the Commander's Cross of the Military Order of Maria Theresa for his exceptional military merits. On 25 January 1767, he was promoted to the rank of artillery general Feldzeugmeister (FZM). In 1769 he became the chief inspector general of the Habsburg army for the border areas of the Monarchy Military Frontier and was involved in the process of its reorganization.

On 13 October 1775, he was granted the county, and at the same time was appointed military commander of Galicia. Four years later, on 30 April 1779, he was transferred to the post of military commander of Bohemia (Czechoslovakia) based in Prague.

Josip Count Šišković died at the age of 64 in Prague on 4 February 1783. According to some sources, the date of his death is different, so it is stated that he died on 18 December 1783, or 28 December of the same year. His body was buried in the chapel of St. Sigismund of Burgundy in the Cathedral of St. Vitus in Prague, where his tombstone can still be seen today.

== See more ==
- List of Croatian soldiers
- Orders, decorations, and medals of Croatia
