= Gallier =

Gallier is a surname that may refer to:

- Billy Gallier (1932–2011), English association football player
- Howard Gallier (1872–1955), English association football player
- James Gallier (1798–1866), architect, born Gallagher in Ireland and changed name to Gallier when moving to New Orleans
- James Gallier, Jr. (1827–1868), architect, son of James
- Jean Gallier (born 1949), French and American logician

== See also ==
- Gallagher (surname)
- Galler, another similar surname
- Gallier Hall, the former New Orleans city hall, built by James Gallier
- Gallier House, the New Orleans home of James Gallier, Jr.
- Irena Gallier, fictional protagonist of Cat People (1982 film)
- TSV Großbardorf, a German association football club nicknamed Gallier (the German word for Gauls)
