= Thorax =

Frontal part of an animal's body, between its head and abdomen

Thorax Chest
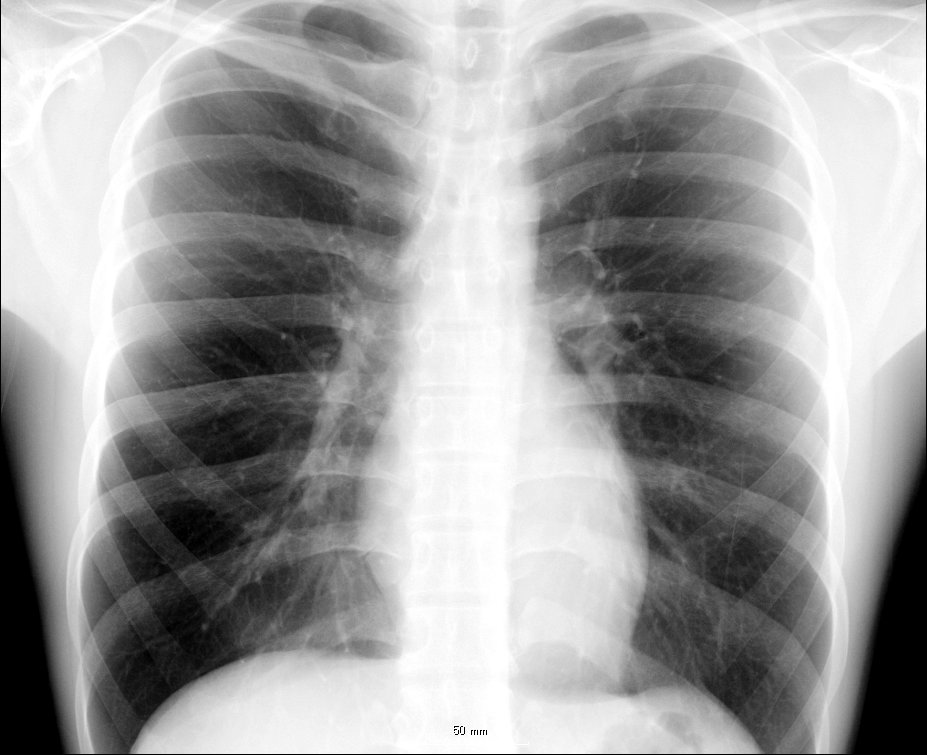
- X-ray image of the human chest showing the internal anatomy of the rib cage, lungs and heart as well as the inferior thoracic border–made up of the diaphragm.

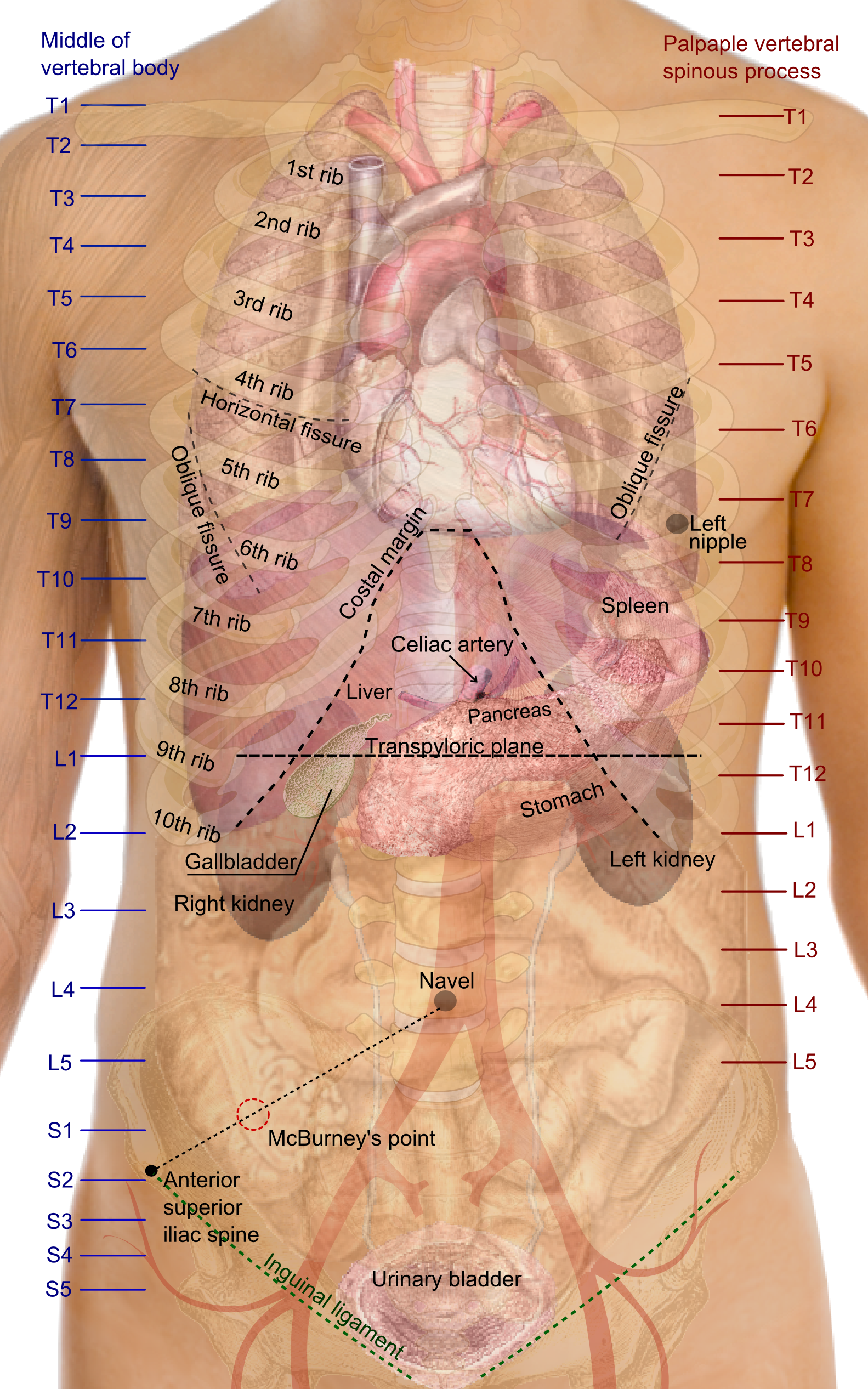
- Surface projections of the organs of the trunk, with the thorax or chest region seen stretching down to approximately the end of the oblique lung fissure anteriorly, but more deeply its lower limit rather corresponds to the upper border of the liver.

Details

Identifiers
- Latin: thorax
- Greek: θώραξ
- MeSH: D013909
- TA98: A01.1.00.014
- TA2: 125
- FMA: 9576

The thorax (pl.: thoraces or thoraxes) or chest is a part of the anatomy of mammals and other tetrapod animals located between the neck and the abdomen.

In insects, crustaceans, and the extinct trilobites, the thorax is one of the three main divisions of the body, each in turn composed of multiple segments.

The human thorax includes the thoracic cavity and the thoracic wall. It contains organs including the heart, lungs, and thymus gland, as well as muscles and various other internal structures. The chest may be affected by many diseases, of which the most common symptom is chest pain.

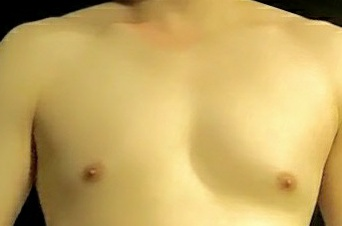
22-year-old male chest and nipples

== Etymology ==
The word thorax comes from the Greek θώραξ thṓrax "breastplate, cuirass, corslet" via Latin: thorax.

== Humans ==
=== Structure ===
In humans and other hominids, the thorax is the chest region of the body between the neck and the abdomen, along with its internal organs and other contents. It is mostly protected and supported by the rib cage, spine, and shoulder girdle.

==== Contents ====
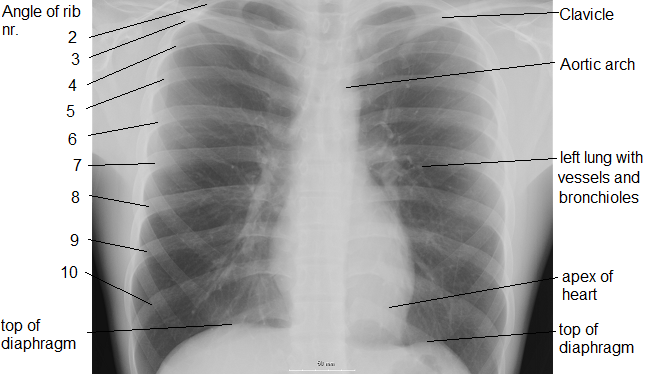
An X-ray of a human chest area, with some structures labeled

The contents of the thorax include the heart and lungs (and the thymus gland); the major and minor pectoral muscles, trapezius muscles, and neck muscle; and internal structures such as the diaphragm, the esophagus, the trachea, and a part of the sternum known as the xiphoid process. Arteries and veins are also contained – (aorta, superior vena cava, inferior vena cava and the pulmonary artery); bones (the shoulder socket containing the upper part of the humerus, the scapula, sternum, thoracic portion of the spine, collarbone, and the rib cage and floating ribs).

External structures are the skin and nipples.

==== Chest ====
In the human body, the region of the thorax between the neck and diaphragm in the front of the body is called the chest. The corresponding area in an animal can also be referred to as the chest.

The shape of the chest does not correspond to that part of the thoracic skeleton that encloses the heart and lungs. All the breadth of the shoulders is due to the shoulder girdle, and contains the axillae and the heads of the humeri. In the middle line the suprasternal notch is seen above, while about three fingers' breadth below it a transverse ridge can be felt, which is known as the sternal angle and this marks the junction between the manubrium and body of the sternum. Level with this line the second ribs join the sternum, and when these are found the lower ribs can often be counted. At the lower part of the sternum, where the seventh or last true ribs join it, the ensiform cartilage begins, and above this there is often a depression known as the pit of the stomach.

==== Bones ====
The bones of the thorax, called the "thoracic skeleton" is a component of the axial skeleton.

It consists of the ribs and sternum. The ribs of the thorax are numbered in ascending order from 1–12. 11 and 12 are known as floating ribs because they have no anterior attachment point in particular the cartilage attached to the sternum, as 1 through 7 are, and therefore are termed "floating". Whereas ribs 8 through 10 are termed false ribs as their costal cartilage articulates with the costal cartilage of the rib above. The thorax bones also have the main function of protecting the heart, lungs, and major blood vessels in the thorax area, such as the aorta.

==== Landmarks ====
The anatomy of the chest can also be described through the use of anatomical landmarks. The nipple in the male is situated in front of the fourth rib or a little below; vertically it lies a little external to a line drawn down from the middle of the clavicle; in the female it is not so constant. A little below it the lower limit of the great pectoral muscle is seen running upward and outward to the axilla; in the female this is obscured by the breast, which extends from the second to the sixth rib vertically and from the edge of the sternum to the mid-axillary line laterally. The female nipple is surrounded for half an inch by a more or less pigmented disc, the areola. The apex of a normal heart is in the fifth left intercostal space, three and a half inches from the mid-line.

=== Clinical significance ===
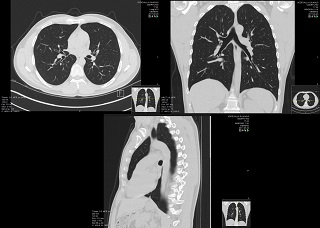
High-resolution computed tomographs of a normal thorax, taken in the axial, coronal and sagittal planes, respectively. This type of investigation can be used for detecting both acute and chronic changes in the lung parenchyma.

Different types of diseases or conditions that affect the chest include pleurisy, flail chest, atelectasis, and the most common condition, chest pain. These conditions can be hereditary or caused by birth defects or trauma. Any condition that lowers the ability to either breathe deeply or to cough is considered a chest disease or condition.

==== Injury ====
Injury to the chest (also referred to as chest trauma, thoracic injury, or thoracic trauma) results in up to 1/4 of all deaths due to trauma in the United States.

The major pathophysiologies encountered in blunt chest trauma involve derangements in the flow of air, blood, or both in combination. Sepsis due to leakage of alimentary tract contents, as in esophageal perforations, also must be considered. Blunt trauma commonly results in chest wall injuries (e.g., rib fractures). The pain associated with these injuries can make breathing difficult, and this may compromise ventilation. Direct lung injuries, such as pulmonary contusions (see the image below), are frequently associated with major chest trauma and may impair ventilation by a similar mechanism.

==== Pain ====
Chest pain can be the result of multiple issues, including respiratory problems, digestive issues, and musculoskeletal complications. The pain can trigger cardiac issues as well. Not all pain that is felt is associated with the heart, but it should not be taken lightly either. Symptoms can be different depending on the cause of the pain. While cardiac issues cause feelings of sudden pressure in the chest or a crushing pain in the back, neck, and arms, pain that is felt due to noncardiac issues gives a burning feeling along the digestive tract or pain when deep breaths are attempted. Different people feel pains differently for the same condition. Only a patient truly knows if the symptoms are mild or serious.

Chest pain may be a symptom of myocardial infarctions ('heart attack'). If this condition is present in the body, discomfort will be felt in the chest that is similar to a heavy weight placed on the body. Sweating, shortness of breath, lightheadedness, and irregular heartbeat may also be experienced. If a heart attack occurs, the bulk of the damage is caused during the first six hours, so getting the proper treatment as quickly as possible is important. Some people, especially those who are elderly or have diabetes, may not have typical chest pain but may have many of the other symptoms of a heart attack. It is important that these patients and their caregivers have a good understanding of heart attack symptoms.

===== Non-cardiac causes =====
As with a heart attack, not all chest pain is caused by conditions involving the heart. Chest wall pain can be experienced after an increase in activity. Persons who add exercise to their daily routine generally feel this type of pain at the beginning. It is important to monitor the pain to ensure that it is not a sign of something more serious. Pain can also be experienced in persons who have an upper respiratory infection, which is accompanied by a fever and cough. Shingles is another viral infection that can give symptoms of chest or rib pain before a rash develops. Injuries to the rib cage or sternum is also a common cause of chest pain. It is generally felt when deep breaths are taken or during a cough.

==== Atelectasis ====
Another non-cardiac cause of chest pain is atelectasis. It is a condition that occurs when a portion of the lung collapses from being airless. When bronchial tubes are blocked, this condition develops and causes patients to feel shortness of breath. The most common cause of atelectasis is when a bronchi that extends from the windpipe is blocked and traps air. The blockage may be caused by something inside the bronchus, such as a plug of mucus, a tumour, or an inhaled foreign object such as a coin, piece of food, or a toy. It is possible for something outside of the bronchus to cause the blockage.

==== Pneumothorax ====
Pneumothorax is the condition where air or gas can build up in the pleural space. It can occur without a known cause or as the result of a lung disease or acute lung injury. The size of the pneumothorax changes as air or gas builds up, so a medical procedure can release the pressure with a needle. If it is untreated, blood flow can be interrupted and cause a drop in blood pressure known as tension pneumothorax. It is possible for smaller cases to clear up on their own. Symptoms of this condition are often felt only on one side of the lung or as a shortness of breath.

=== Images ===
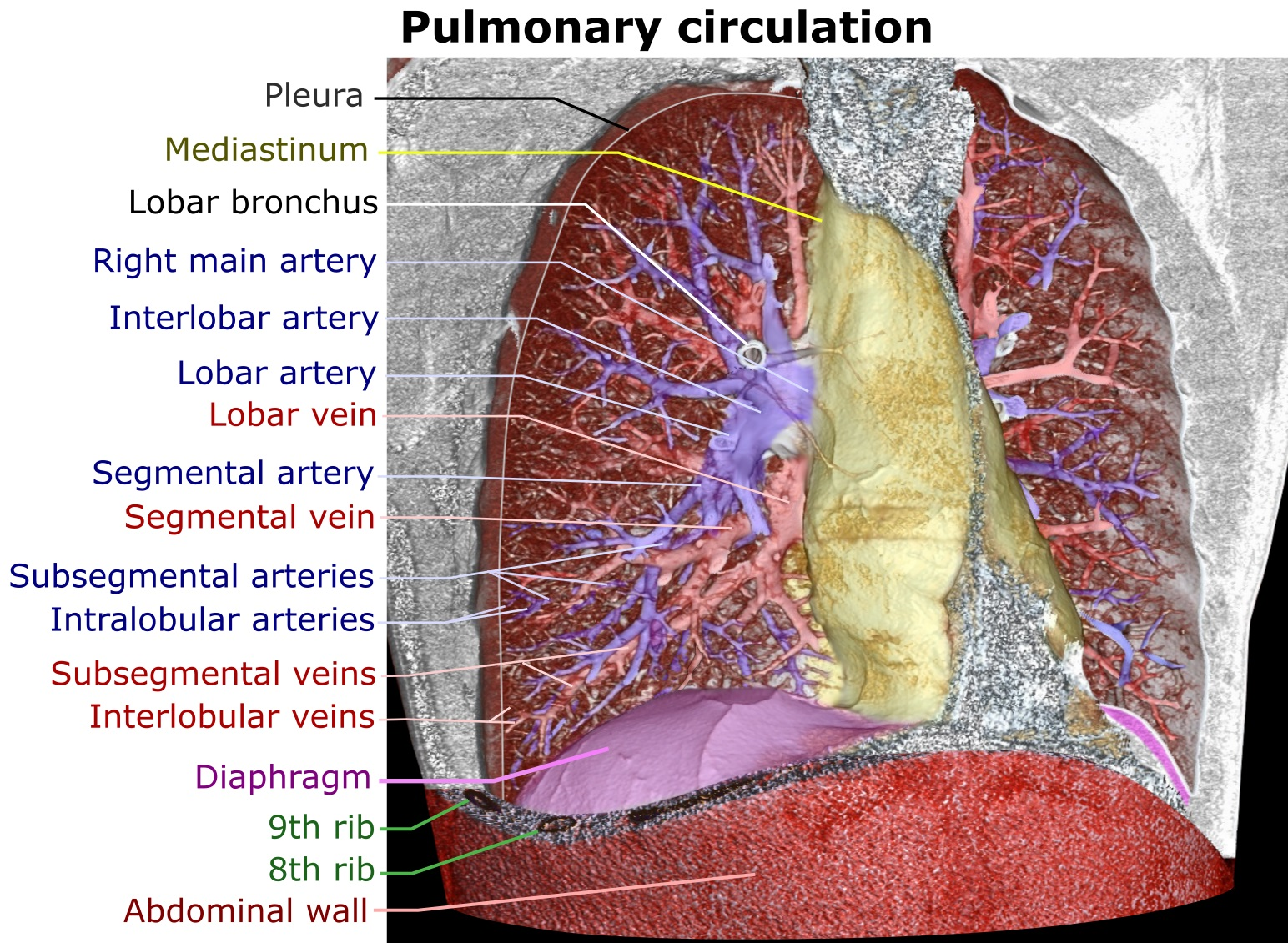
Volume rendering of a high resolution computed tomography of the thorax. The anterior thoracic wall, the airways and the pulmonary vessels anterior to the root of the lung have been digitally removed in order to visualize the different levels of the pulmonary circulation.

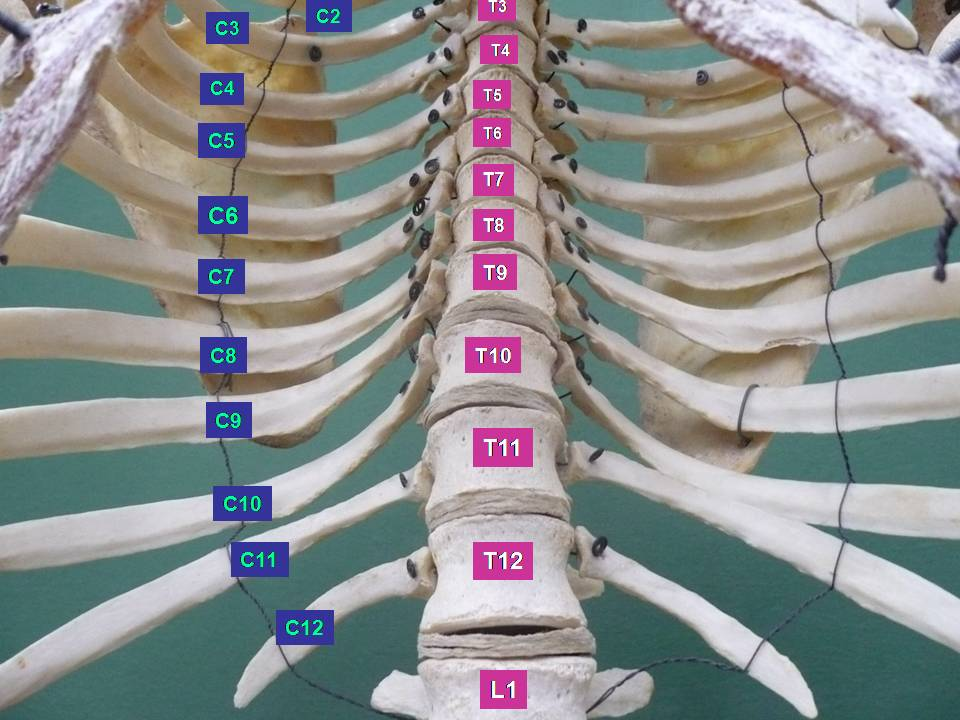
Thorax. Anterior view.

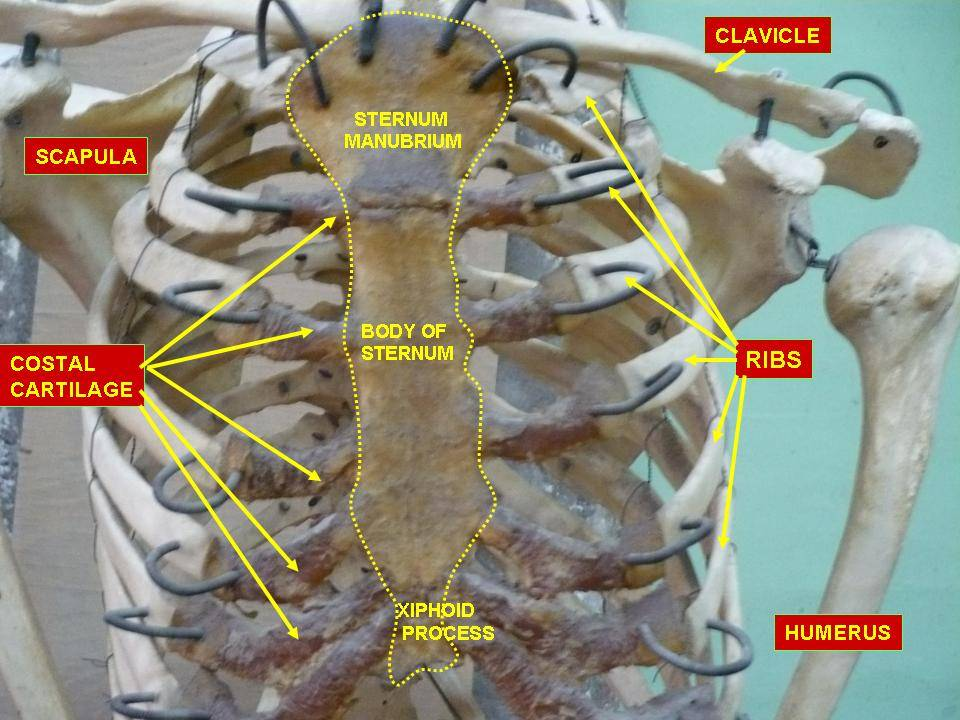
Thorax. Anterior view.

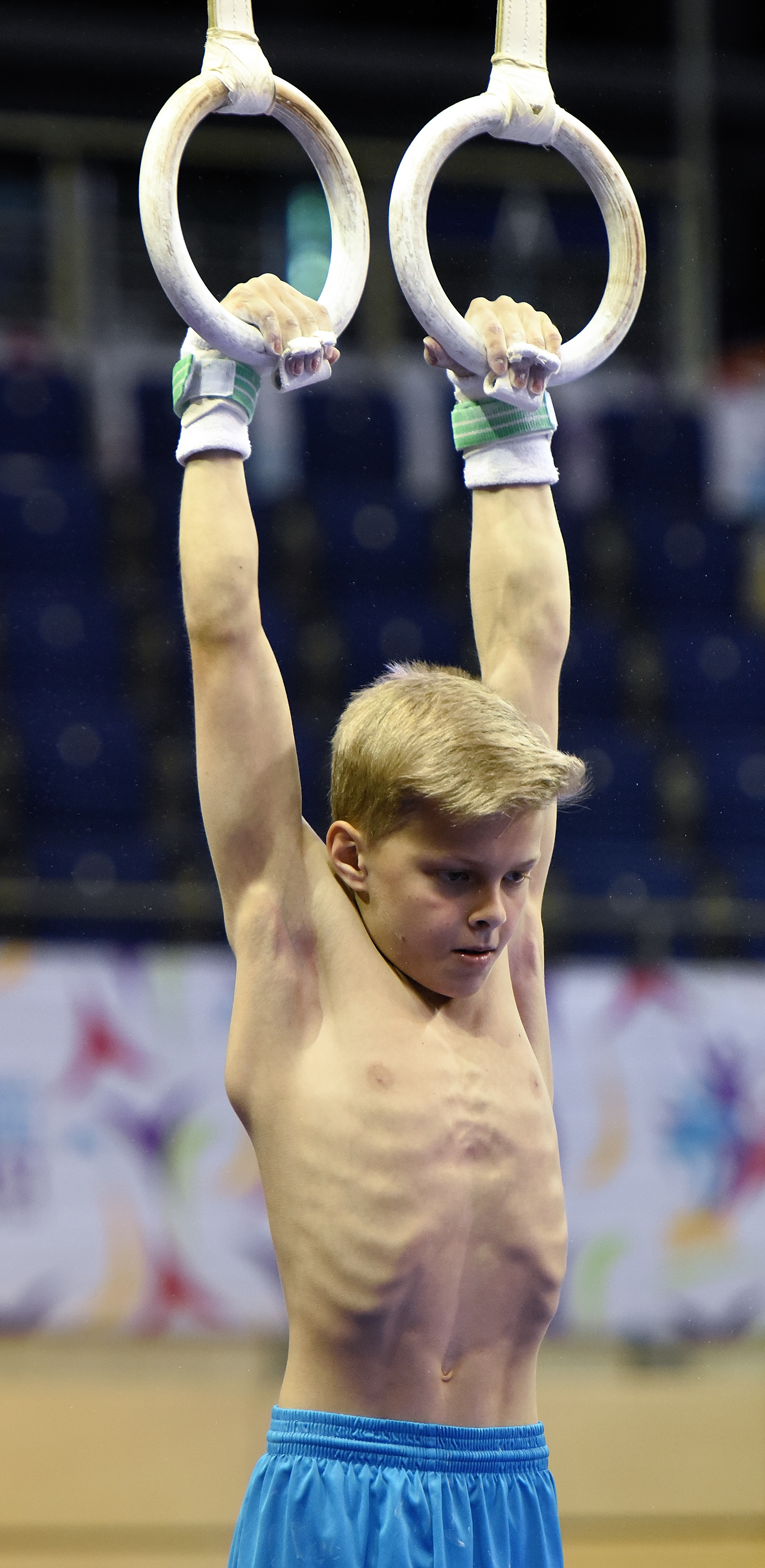
Clearly visible thorax of an artistic gymnast.

== Tetrapods ==
In mammals, the thorax is the region of the body formed by the sternum, the thoracic vertebrae, and the ribs. It extends from the neck to the diaphragm, and does not include the upper limbs. The heart and the lungs reside in the thoracic cavity, as well as many blood vessels. The inner organs are protected by the rib cage and the sternum. Thoracic vertebrae are also distinguished in birds, but not in reptiles.

== Arthropods ==
The trilobite body is divided into three major sections, a cephalon with eyes, mouthparts and sensory organs such as antennae, a thorax of multiple similar segments (that in some species allowed them to roll up into a ball), and a pygidium, or tail section.

In the worker ant, the abdomen consists of the propodeum fused to the thorax and the metasoma, itself divided into the narrow petiole and bulbous gaster.

In insects, crustaceans, and the extinct trilobites, the thorax is the middle one of the three main divisions of the creature's body, each of which is in turn composed of multiple segments. It is the area where the wings and legs attach in insects, or an area of multiple articulating plates in trilobites. In most insects, the thorax itself is composed of three segments; the prothorax, the mesothorax, and the metathorax. In extant insects, the prothorax never has wings, though legs are always present in adults; wings (when present) are restricted to at least the mesothorax, and typically also the metathorax, though the wings may be reduced or modified on either or both segments. In the apocritan Hymenoptera, the first abdominal segment is fused to the metathorax, where it forms a structure known as the propodeum. Accordingly, in these insects, the functional thorax is composed of four segments, and is therefore typically called the mesosoma to distinguish it from the "thorax" of other insects.

Each thoracic segment in an insect is further subdivided into various parts, the most significant of which are the dorsal portion (the notum), the lateral portion (the pleuron; one on each side), and the ventral portion (the sternum). In some insects, each of these parts is composed of one to several independent exoskeletal plates with membrane between them (called sclerites), though in many cases the sclerites are fused to various degrees.

== See also ==
- Pectus carinatum
- Pectus excavatum
- Thoracic cavity
- Cardiothoracic surgery
