= J. Alex Haller =

American surgeon (1927–2018)

- Born: May 20, 1927; Pulaski, Virginia, United States
- Died: June 13, 2018 (aged 91); Glencoe, Maryland, United States
- Education: Johns Hopkins School of Medicine
- Occupation: Pediatric surgeon
- Notable work: Haller index
- Spouse: Emily Simms

Logo of the Maryland Emergency Medical Services Program, established by Haller and R Adams Cowley

Jacob Alexander Haller Jr. (May 20, 1927 – June 13, 2018) was an American pediatric surgeon who served as the first Robert Garrett Professor of Pediatric Surgery at the Johns Hopkins School of Medicine.

Haller Jr. was born in Pulaski, Virginia, to a family of dentists and physicians originally from York, Pennsylvania. His father, J. Alex Haller Sr., raised him with the help of two aunts, after his mother, Julia Allison, died. Haller Jr. contracted scarlet fever as a child, which led him to study medicine. He played basketball and football at Pulaski High School, graduating in 1944. Haller considered attending the University of Virginia in his home state, but was accepted at Vanderbilt University, where he had applied at his high school principal's suggestion. There, Haller met his future wife, Emily Simms, and played for the Vanderbilt Commodores men's basketball team until his senior year of college. Haller planned to enroll at the Vanderbilt University School of Medicine, but applied to the Johns Hopkins School of Medicine, having heard from professors that Hopkins specialized in surgery, his field of choice. After completing his medical degree at Hopkins in 1951, Haller pursued further study in Europe on the advice of Arnold R. Rich. Haller was trained in pathology under Hans von Meyenburg at the University of Zurich.

Haller was conscripted after his return from Switzerland. Rejected by the United States Navy due to color blindness, he instead joined the Coast Guard in 1953, where he served six months at the Coast Guard Surgical Unit in San Pedro, California. He later transferred to the National Heart Institute, where he served until 1955. After completing his residency at Hopkins, Haller began teaching at the University of Louisville in 1959, and later served as chief of cardiac surgery at the Louisville General Hospital.

Haller returned to Johns Hopkins in 1963 as assistant professor of surgery, and led the newly established pediatric surgery division. He was appointed the first Robert Garrett Professor of Pediatric Surgery in 1967. Over the course of his career, Haller helped develop the Advanced Pediatric Life Support program, and the Maryland Emergency Medical Services system. He is the namesake and co-creator of the Haller index. Haller was a founding member and later president of the American Pediatric Surgical Association. He retired in 1992.

Haller died at home in Glencoe, Maryland, on June 13, 2018, aged 91.
