= Galor (surname) =

Galor or Gal-Or (Hebrew: גל-אור) is a surname. Notable people with the surname include:

- Oded Galor (born 1953), Israeli-American economist and academic
- Amir Gal-Or (born 1962), Israeli entrepreneur
- Katharina Galor (born 1966), German-born Israeli archaeologist
- Raz Gal-Or (born 1994), Israeli businessperson active in China, son of Amir Gal-Or
