= Katharina Galor =

Israeli woman archaeologist

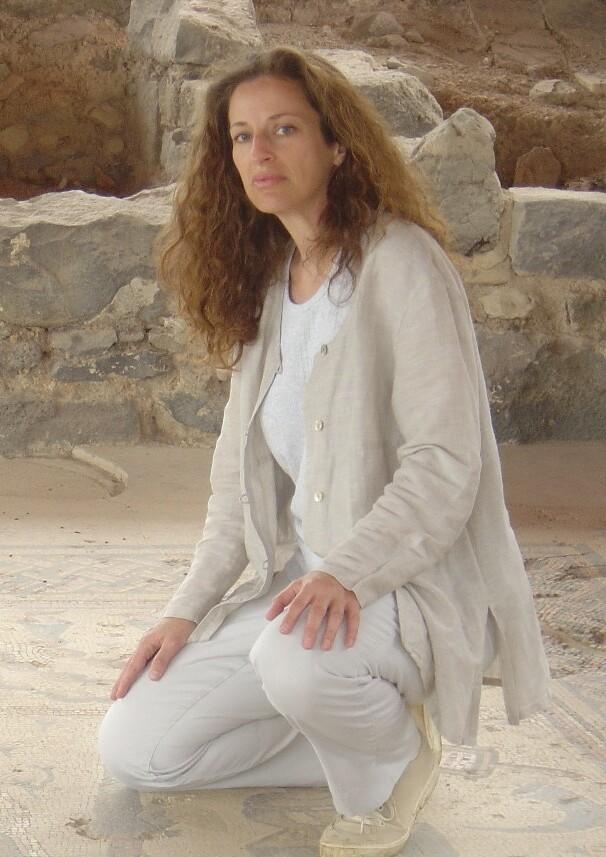
Katharina Galor in the Hamat Tiberias synagogue, 2005

Katharina Galor (Hebrew: קתרינה מ. גלאור; born 1966) is a German-born Israeli art historian and archaeologist specializing in Israel-Palestine. She has been teaching at Brown University since 1998, where she is Hirschfeld Associate Teaching Professor of Judaic Studies.

She was educated in Germany (Comenius Gymnasium), France (Université d’Aix-Marseille), Israel (Hebrew University) and the US (Brown University).

She has held visiting teaching appointments at the École biblique et archéologique française and the Rothberg School at the Hebrew University in Jerusalem, at Humboldt University in Berlin, and at Tufts University and the Rhode Island School of Design in the US. She was a fellow at the W.F. Albright Institute of Archaeological Research in Jerusalem, at the Institute of Archaeology at Hebrew University, at the Antike Kolleg Berlin, the Selma Stern Zentrum für Jüdische Studien Berlin-Brandenburg, and the Chronoi Center of the Einstein Foundation Berlin. She served as President of the American Institute of Archaeology, Narragansett Chapter.

Galor worked as a field archaeologist in France and the Levant between 1988 and 2006 with a scholarly focus on ethnicity, religious affiliation, and gender. Sites she worked on included Apollonia–Arsuf. Since 2006 her interests have shifted to encompass cultural heritage studies with a focus on the Israel-Palestine conflict.

In 2018, Galor was awarded a three-year grant from the Leo Baeck Institute to complete her current book project on Jewish women.

Galor has held positions with the American Academy in Berlin, where she was a Marcus Bierich Distinguished Visitor in 2020; the Katz Center for Advanced Judaic Studies at the University of Pennsylvania, where she was a fellow from 2023 to 2024; the Taub Center for Israel Studies at New York University where she was a visiting scholar from 2024 to 2026; and Bard College where she was a visiting fellow in 2026.

== Publications ==
- The Archaeology of Jerusalem: From the Origins to the Ottomans (New Haven: Yale University Press, 2013; with H. Bloedhorn).
- Finding Jerusalem: Archaeology between Science and Ideology (Berkeley: University of California Press, 2017).
- The Moral Triangle: Germans, Israelis, Palestinians (Durham: Duke University Press, 2020; with Sa’ed Atshan).
- Qumran. The Site of the Dead Sea Scrolls. Archaeological Interpretations and Debates. Proceedings of the Conference held at Brown University November 17–19, 2002, (eds.) K. Galor, J.-B. Humbert, and J. Zangenberg, (Boston: Brill, 2006).
- Crossing the Rift: Resources, Routes, Settlement Patterns and Interaction in the Wadi Arabah, Proceedings of the Conference held at the Fernbank Museum of Natural History in Atlanta, GA, November 19, 2003, (eds.) P. Bienkowski and K. Galor, in Levant Supplementary Series 3 (Winona Lake: Eisenbrauns, 2006).
- From Antioch to Alexandria. Studies in Domestic Architecture during the Roman and Byzantine Periods, (eds.) Galor, K. and Waliszewski, T. Warsaw: Institute of Archaeology, University of Warsaw, 2007.
- Unearthing Jerusalem: 150 Years of Archaeological Research in the Holy City. Proceedings of the Conference held at Brown University November 12–14, 2006, (eds.) K. Galor and G. Avni (Winona Lake: Eisenbrauns, 2011).
- Gender and Social Norms in Ancient Israel, Early Judaism and Christianity. Texts and Material Culture. Proceedings of the conference held at the University of Koblenz-Landau, Germany, February 18–21, 2016, (eds.), M. Bauks, K. Galor and J. Hartenstein, in Journal of Ancient Judaism. Supplements (Göttingen: Vandenhoeck & Ruprecht, 2019).
