= Pectus excavatum =

Congenital deformity of the chest

- Other names: Funnel chest, dented chest, sunken chest, concave chest, chest hole
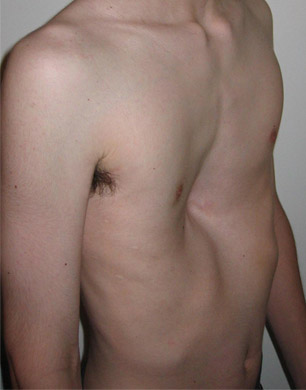
- An example of a severe case of pectus excavatum
- Specialty: Orthopedics

Pectus excavatum is a structural deformity of the anterior thoracic wall in which the sternum and rib cage are shaped abnormally. This produces a caved-in or sunken appearance of the chest. It can either be present at birth or develop after puberty.

Pectus excavatum can impair cardiac and respiratory function and cause pain in the chest and back.

People with the condition may experience severe negative psychosocial effects and avoid activities that expose the chest.

== Etymology ==
Pectus excavatum is from Latin meaning hollowed chest. It is sometimes referred to as sunken chest syndrome, cobbler's chest or funnel chest.

== Signs and symptoms ==
The hallmark of the condition is a sunken appearance of the sternum. The most common form is a cup-shaped concavity, involving the lower end of the sternum; a broader concavity involving the upper costal cartilages is possible. The lower-most ribs may protrude ("flared ribs"). Pectus excavatum defects may be symmetric or asymmetric.

People may also experience chest and back pain, which is usually of musculoskeletal origin.

In mild cases, cardiorespiratory function is normal, although the heart can be displaced and/or rotated. In severe cases, the right atrium may be compressed, mitral valve prolapse may be present, and physical capability may be limited due to base lung capacity being decreased.

Psychological symptoms manifest with feelings of embarrassment, social anxiety, shame, limited capacity for activities and communication, negativity, intolerance, frustration, and even depression.

== Causes ==
Researchers are unsure of the cause of pectus excavatum. Some researchers take the stance that it is a congenital disorder (birth defect), but not genetic. Others assume that there is some genetic component. A small sample size test found that in at least some cases, 37% of individuals have an affected first degree family member. As of 2012, a number of genetic markers for pectus excavatum had also been discovered.

It was believed for decades that pectus excavatum is caused by an overgrowth of costal cartilage; however, people with pectus excavatum actually tend to have shorter, not longer, costal cartilage relative to rib length.

Pectus excavatum can be present in other conditions too, including Noonan syndrome, Marfan syndrome and Loeys–Dietz syndrome as well as other connective tissue disorders such as Ehlers–Danlos syndrome. Many children with spinal muscular atrophy develop pectus excavatum due to their diaphragmatic breathing.

== Pathophysiology ==
Physiologically, increased pressure in utero, rickets and increased traction on the sternum due to abnormalities of the diaphragm have been postulated as specific mechanisms. Because the heart is located behind the sternum, and because individuals with pectus excavatum have been shown to have visible deformities of the heart seen both on radiological imaging and after autopsies, it has been hypothesized that there is impairment of the function of the cardiovascular system in individuals with pectus excavatum.

While some studies have demonstrated decreased cardiovascular function, no consensus has been reached based on newer physiological tests such as echocardiography of the presence or degree of impairment in cardiovascular function. However, a 2016 meta-analysis found significant evidence that surgical correction of pectus excavatum improves patient cardiac performance.

== Diagnosis ==
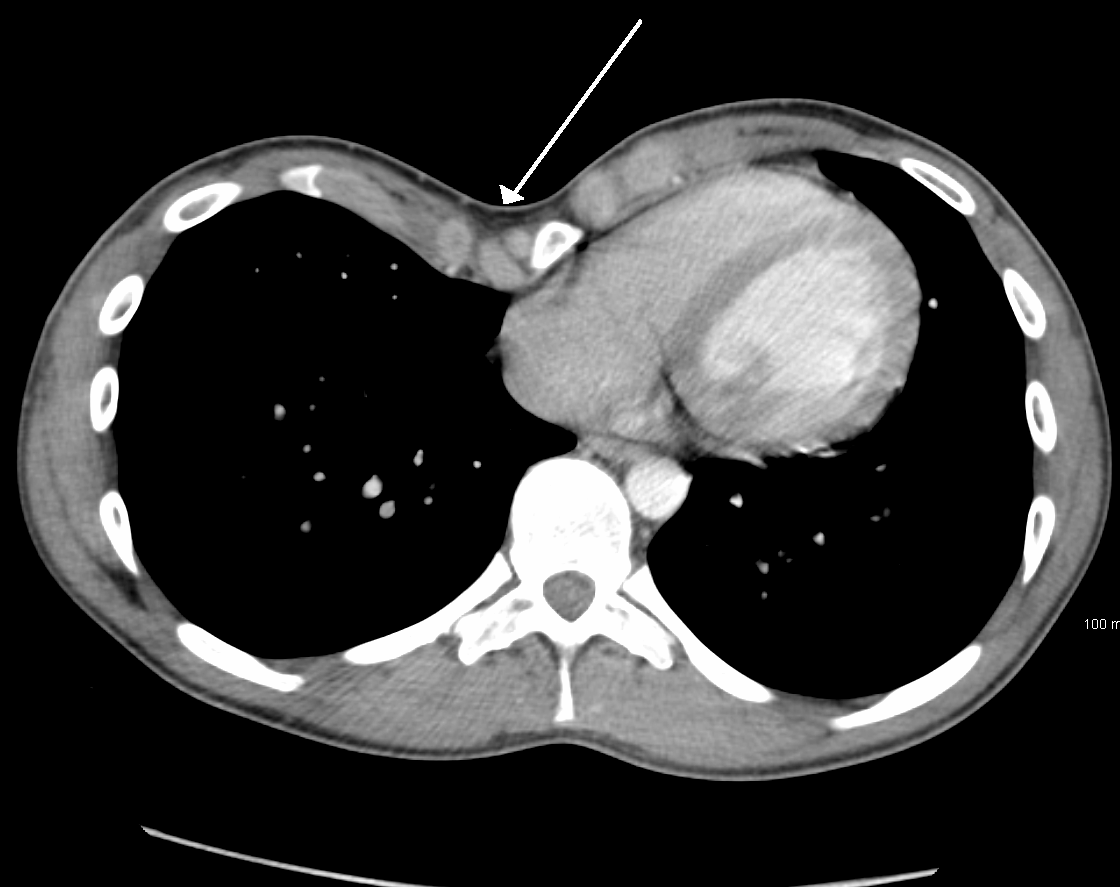
Cross sectional scan of a chest with pectus excavatum

Pectus excavatum is initially suspected from visual examination of the anterior chest. Auscultation of the chest can reveal displaced heartbeat and valve prolapse. There can be a heart murmur occurring during systole caused by proximity between the sternum and the pulmonary artery. Lung sounds are usually clear yet diminished due to decreased base lung capacity.

Many scales have been developed to determine the degree of deformity in the chest wall. Most of these are variants on the distance between the sternum and the spine. One such index is the Backer ratio which grades the severity of deformity based on the ratio between the diameter of the vertebral body nearest to xiphosternal junction and the distance between the xiphosternal junction and the nearest vertebral body. More recently the Haller index has been used based on CT scan measurements. An index over 3.25 is often defined as severe. The Haller index is the ratio between the horizontal distance of the inside of the ribcage and the shortest distance between the vertebrae and sternum.

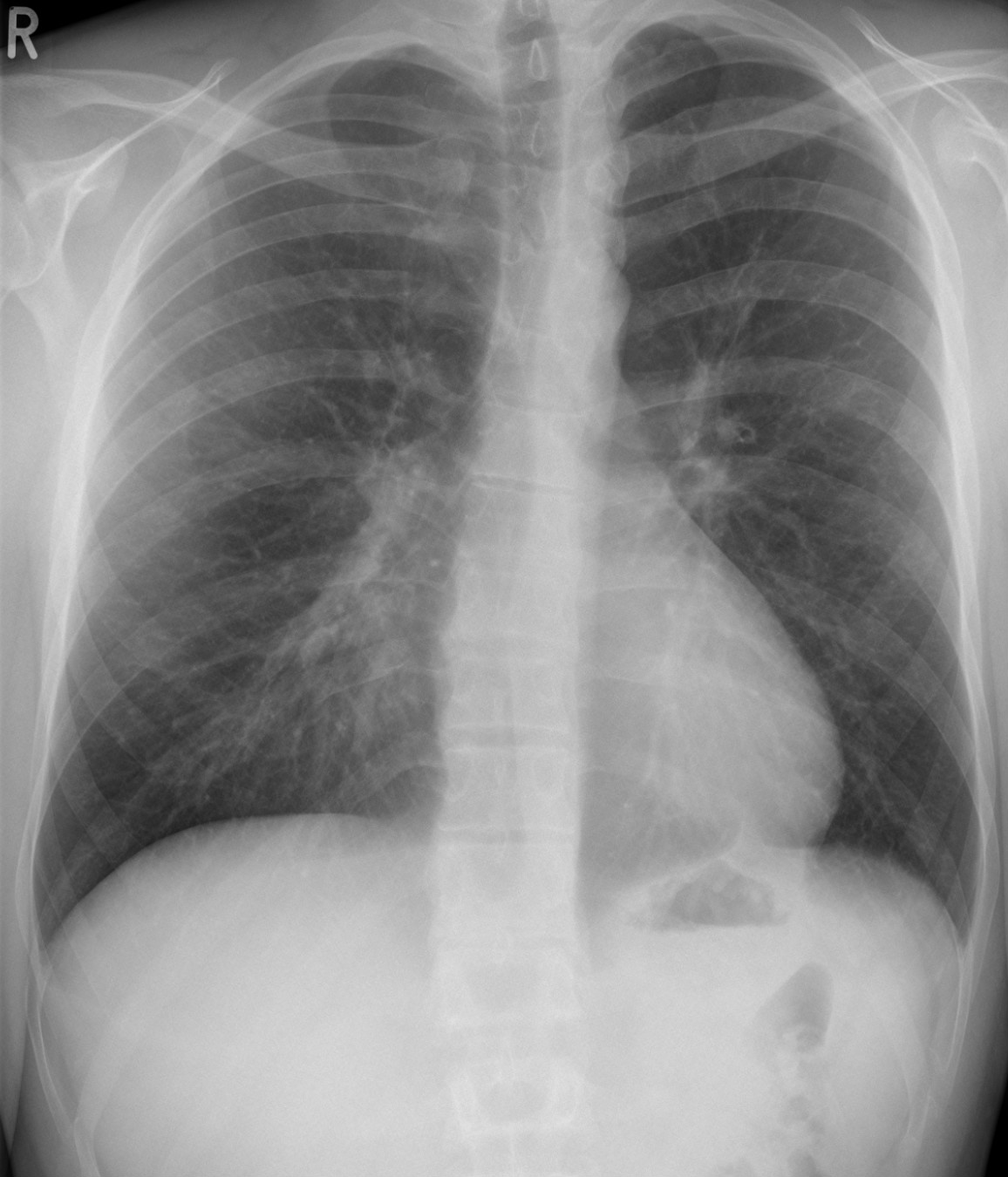
Pectus excavatum on PA chest radiograph with shift of heart shadow to the left and radioopacity of the right paracardiac lung field

Chest x-rays are also useful in the diagnosis. The chest x-ray in pectus excavatum can show an opacity in the right lung area that can be mistaken for an infiltrate (such as that seen with pneumonia). Some studies also suggest that the Haller index can be calculated based on chest x-ray as opposed to CT scanning in individuals who have no limitation in their function.

Pectus excavatum is differentiated from other disorders by a series of elimination of signs and symptoms. Pectus carinatum is excluded by the simple observation of a collapsing of the sternum rather than a protrusion. Kyphoscoliosis is excluded by diagnostic imaging of the spine, wherein pectus excavatum, the spine usually appears normal in structure.

== Treatment ==
Pectus excavatum requires no corrective procedures in mild cases. Treatment of severe cases can involve either invasive or non-invasive techniques or a combination of both. Before an operation proceeds, several tests are usually performed. These include, but are not limited to, a CT scan, pulmonary function tests, and cardiology exams (such as auscultation and ECGs). After a CT scan is taken, the Haller index is measured. The patient's Haller index is calculated by obtaining the ratio of the transverse diameter (the horizontal distance of the inside of the ribcage) and the anteroposterior diameter (the shortest distance between the vertebrae and sternum). A Haller index of greater than 3.25 is generally considered severe, while normal chest has an index of 2.5. The cardiopulmonary tests are used to determine the lung capacity and to check for heart murmurs.

=== Conservative treatment ===
The chest wall is elastic, gradually stiffening with age. Non-surgical treatments have been developed that aim at gradually alleviating the pectus excavatum condition, making use of the elasticity of the chest wall, including the costal cartilages, in particular in young cases.

==== Exercise ====
Physical exercise has an important role in conservative pectus excavatum treatment, though it is not seen as a means to resolve the condition on its own. It is used in order to halt or slow the progression of mild or moderate excavatum conditions and as supplementary treatment to improve a poor posture, to prevent secondary complications, and to prevent relapse after treatment.

Exercises are aimed at improving posture, strengthening back and chest muscles, and enhancing exercise capacity, ideally also increasing chest expansion. Pectus exercises include deep breathing and breath holding exercises, as well as strength training for the back and chest muscles. Additionally, aerobic exercises to improve cardiopulmonary function are employed.

==== Vacuum bell ====
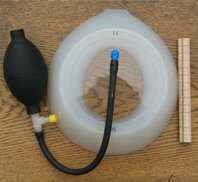
Vacuum bell for pectus excavatum treatment, with hand pump (left) and measuring rod (right)

An alternative to surgery, the vacuum bell, was described in 2006; the procedure is also referred to as treatment by cup suction. It consists of a bowl-shaped device that fits over the caved-in area; the air is then removed by the use of a hand pump. The vacuum created by this lifts the sternum upwards, lessening the severity of the deformity. It has been proposed as an alternative to surgery in less severe cases. Once the defect visually disappears, two additional years of use of the vacuum bell is required to make what may be a permanent correction. The treatment, in combination with physiotherapy exercises, has been judged by some as "a promising useful alternative" to surgery provided the thorax is flexible; the duration of treatment that is required has been found to be "directly linked to age, severity and the frequency of use". Long-term results are still lacking.

A single-center study reported in the Journal of Pediatric Surgery found that use of vacuum bell therapy resulted in an excellent correction in twenty percent of patients, but "is not a substitute for the Nuss procedure which can achieve an excellent result in 90% of patients". Variables predictive of an excellent outcome include age ≤ 11 years, chest wall depth ≤ 1.5 cm, chest wall flexibility, and vacuum bell use over 12 consecutive months.

In an article published in the journal Interactive Cardiovascular and Thoracic Surgery, the results found that vacuum bell treatment is safe for correcting the deformity non-surgically. The treatment has been shown to have higher success rates in patients who present earlier, have a mild and/or symmetrical deformity, a flexible chest wall and lack of costal flaring.

The vacuum bell can also be used in preparation to surgery.

==== Orthoses ====
Brazilian orthopedist Sydney Haje developed a non-surgical protocol for treating pectus carinatum as well as pectus excavatum. The method involves wearing a compressive orthosis and adhering to an exercise protocol.

Mild cases have also reportedly been treated with corset-like orthopedic support vests and exercise.

=== Thoracic surgery ===
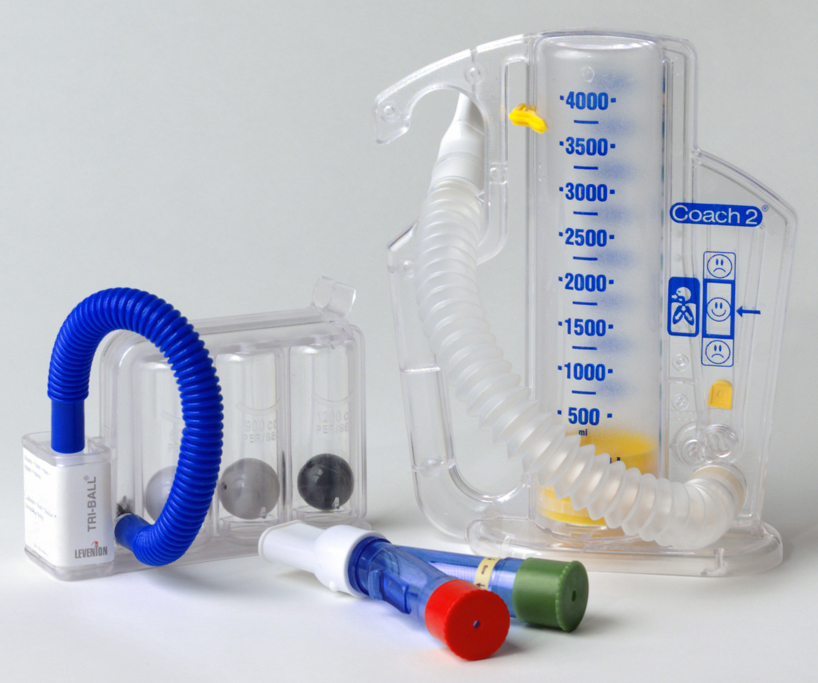
Incentive spirometers deepen lung ventilation after surgery to avoid atelectasis

There has been controversy as to the best surgical approach for the correction of pectus excavatum. It is important for the surgeon to select the appropriate operative approach based on each individual's characteristics. Surgical correction has been shown to repair any functional symptoms that may occur in the condition, such as respiratory problems or heart murmurs, provided that permanent damage has not already arisen from an extremely severe case.

Surgical correction of the pectus excavatum has been shown to significantly improve cardiovascular function, but so far there is inconclusive evidence as to whether it might also improve pulmonary function. One of the most popular techniques for repair of pectus excavatum today is the minimally invasive operation, also known as MIRPE or Nuss technique, with a system of bars made of metal.

==== External perosseous distraction (Ilizarov) ====
In 1991, Russian surgeons proposed an extra-thoracic technique that combines gradual perosseous distraction osteosynthesis with an Ilizarov apparatus mounted outside the chest wall. The apparatus is fixed to the clavicles and sternum with transosseous wires; daily distraction of 1–2 mm progressively elevates the depressed sternum and costal arches. In a series of 15 patients (children and adults, II–III severity), full correction was achieved within 10–15 days, with bar stabilization for 1–2.5 months and favourable cosmetic and functional outcomes. Key advantages reported were minimal soft-tissue trauma, early mobilisation (2–3 days after the operation period) and avoidance of an internal support bar or postoperative corset, potentially reducing cardiopulmonary complications.

==== Magnetic mini-mover procedure ====
The magnetic mini-mover procedure (3MP) is a minimally invasive procedure used to correct pectus excavatum by using two magnets to realign the sternum with the rest of the chest and ribcage. One magnet is inserted 1 cm into the patient's body on the lower end of the sternum, the other is placed externally onto a custom fitted brace. These two magnets generate around 0.04 tesla (T) in order to slowly move the sternum outwards over a number of years. The maximum magnetic field that can be applied to the body safely is around 4 T, making this technique safe from a magnetic viewpoint. The 3MP technique's main advantages are that it is more cost-effective than major surgical approaches such as the Nuss procedure and it is considerably less painful postoperatively.

Its effectiveness is limited to younger children in early- to mid-puberty because older individuals have less compliant (flexible) chest walls. One potential adverse interaction with other medical devices is possible inactivation of artificial pacemakers if present.

==== Ravitch technique ====
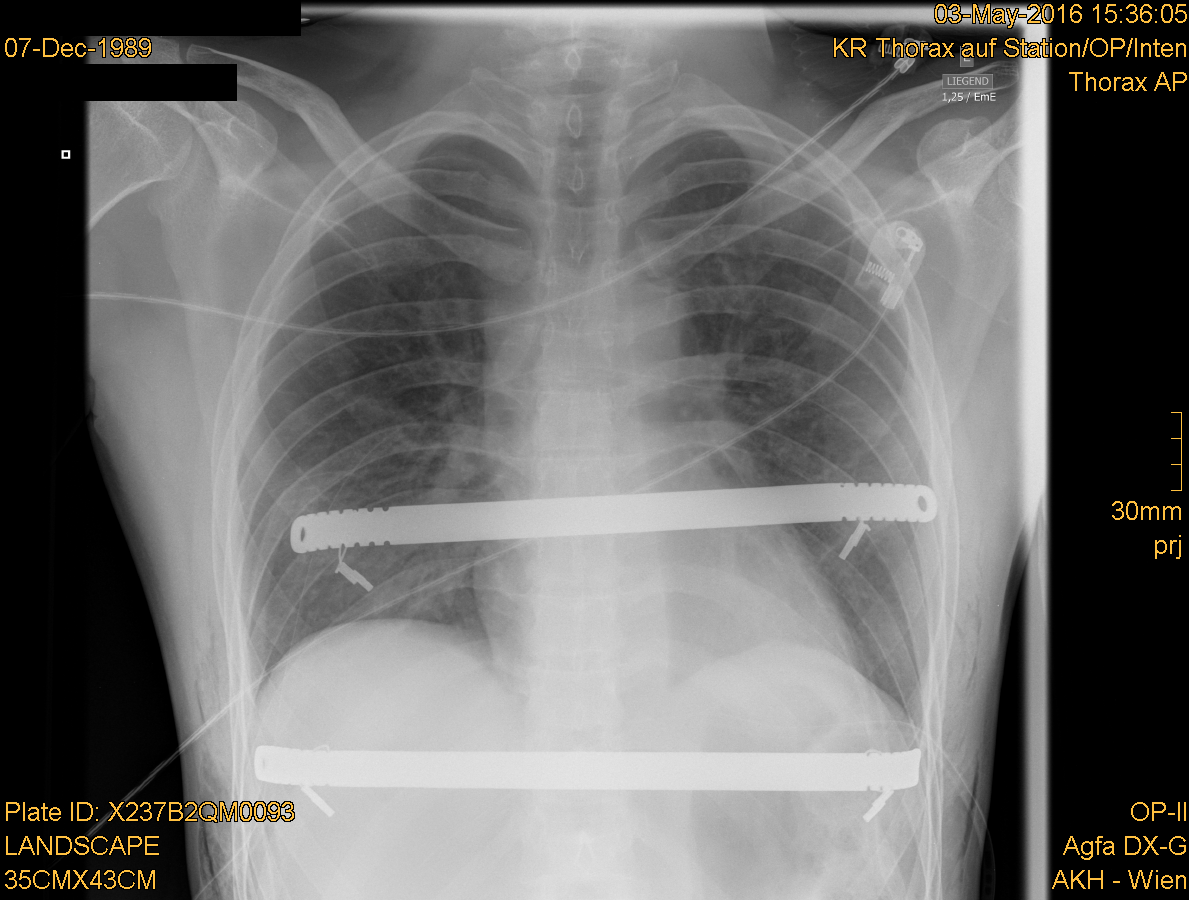
26-year-old male after modified-Ravitch reconstruction

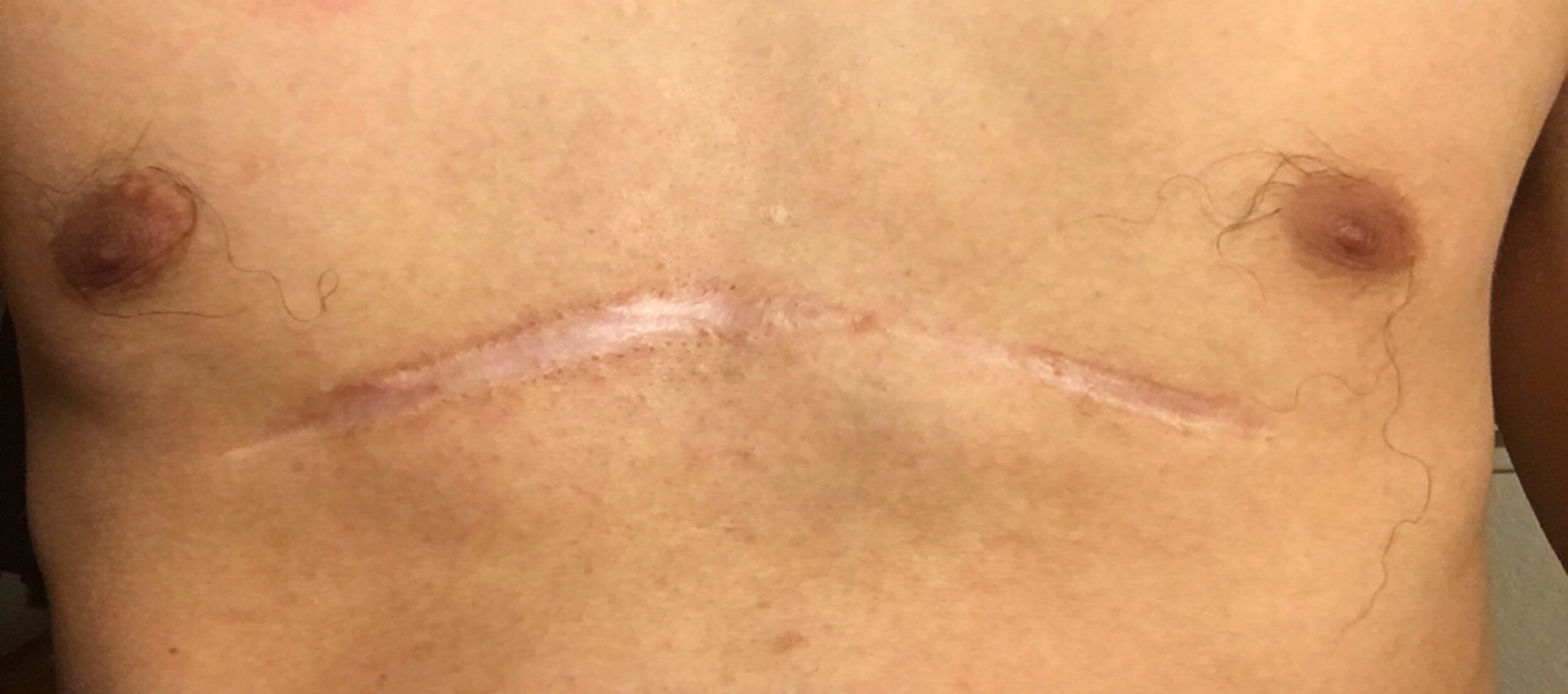
The visible surgical scar on the chest of a 23-year-old male, five years after a successful Ravitch procedure

The Ravitch technique is an invasive surgery that was introduced in 1949 and developed in the 1950s. It involves creating an incision along the chest through which the cartilage is removed and the sternum detached. A small bar is inserted underneath the sternum to hold it up in the desired position. The bar is left implanted until the cartilage grows back, typically about six months. The bar is subsequently removed in a simple outpatient procedure; this technique is thus a two-stage procedure.

The Ravitch technique is not widely practiced because it is so invasive. It is more often used in older individuals, where the sternum has calcified when the deformity is asymmetrical, or when the less invasive Nuss procedure has proven unsuccessful.

The Ravitch procedure may be indicated in specific situations. For instance, it can be employed to address complex asymmetry, where the pectus excavatum exhibits a more pronounced depression on one side of the chest compared to the other. Additionally, the Ravitch technique might be considered for older adults whose chest wall has become less flexible.

During a Ravitch procedure, the surgeon creates an incision either along the inframammary fold (below the breast line) or directly over the sternum. Subsequently, the muscles of the chest wall are carefully elevated and detached from the ribs and the sternum.

If the surgeon determines that the shape of the sternum requires correction, small, wedge-shaped sections of bone may be removed from the sternum. This specific step in the procedure is known as an osteotomy. Next, the surgeon removes cartilage from the affected ribs on each side of the sternum.

The surgeon then attaches the chest muscles back into place. If the sternum needs more support, the surgeon may attach part of a muscle from the abdomen higher up under the sternum.

==== Nuss procedure ====
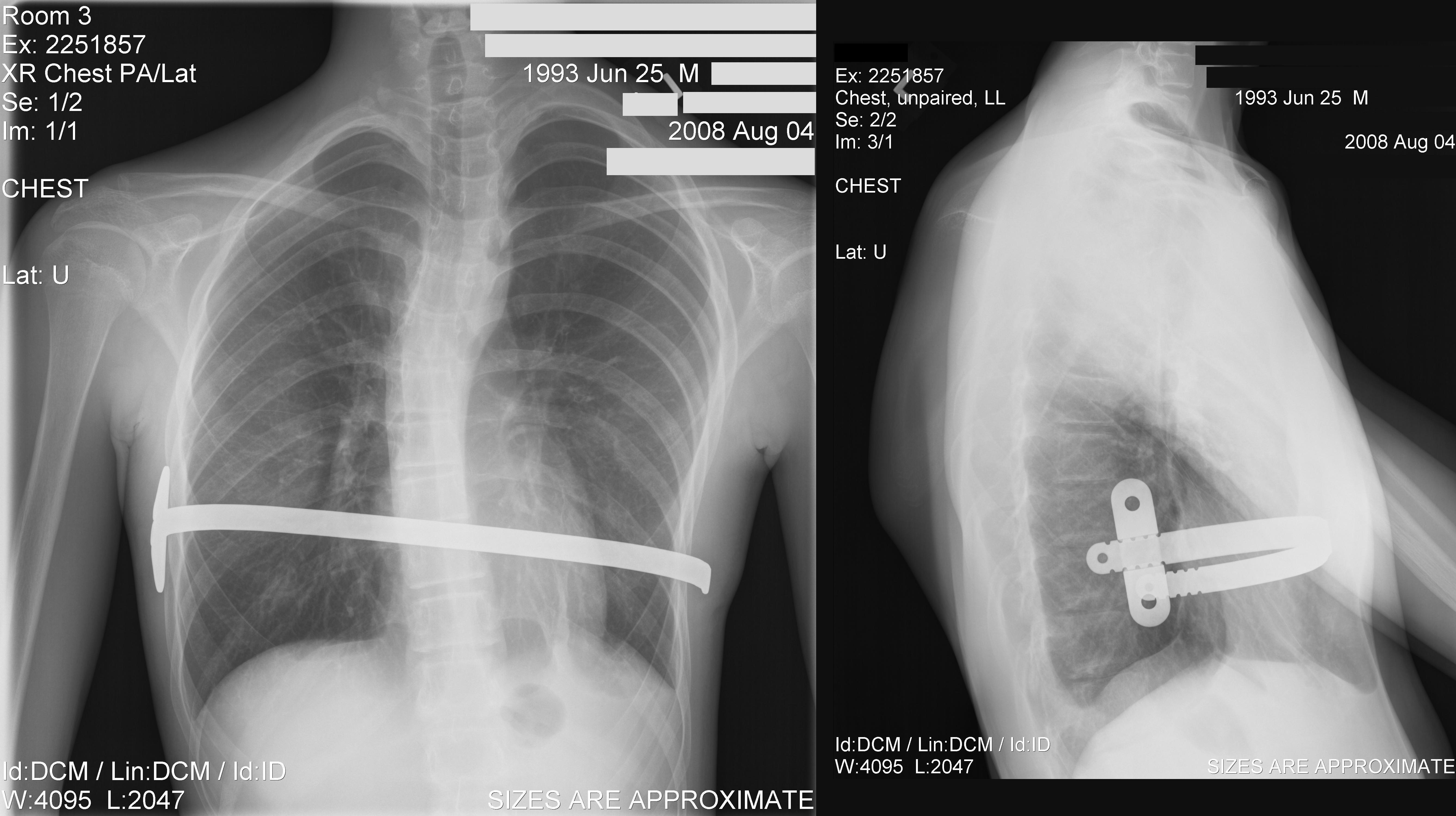
X-ray of a 15-year-old male after undergoing the Nuss procedure

In 1987, Donald Nuss, based at Children's Hospital of The King's Daughters in Norfolk, Virginia, performed the first minimally invasive repair of pectus excavatum (MIRPE) and presented it at a conference in 1997.

The minimally invasive repair of pectus excavatum, known as the Nuss procedure, has become a widely adopted surgical technique. This approach involves inserting a custom-bent bar into the chest to correct the sternal depression, aiming to restore a normal chest wall contour. Prior to the Nuss procedure, patients undergo thorough pre-operative evaluations, including physical examinations, imaging studies (such as CT scans to calculate the Haller index and assess cardiac compression), and cardiopulmonary function tests to determine the severity of the pectus and its impact on the heart and lungs. Studies have consistently shown positive outcomes with the Nuss procedure. For instance, an early experience with 68 patients reported that 93% achieved excellent, very good, or good results following the surgery. This procedure is also characterized by relatively short operative times (averaging around 70 minutes) and a brief hospital stay (mean of 5.7 days). While minor early complications like residual pneumothorax can occur, these often resolve spontaneously.

The surgery is performed under general anesthesia, ensuring the patient is completely asleep and pain-free throughout the procedure. Recent advancements in post-operative care, such as the use of bilateral thoracoscopic cryoanalgesia (cryoablation of intercostal nerves) during the minimally invasive repair, have further enhanced patient recovery. This strategy significantly improves post-operative pain control, leading to earlier patient discharge and a substantial reduction in opioid requirements. In some cohorts, a large majority of patients (e.g., 71%) required at most only one dose of opioids for pain management, facilitating a quicker and more comfortable recovery.

His two-stage procedure, widely known as the Nuss procedure, involves slipping in one or more concave steel bars into the chest, underneath the sternum.

The bar is flipped to a convex position so as to push outward on the sternum, correcting the deformity. The bar usually stays in the body for about two years. When the bones have solidified into place, the bar is removed through outpatient surgery.

Although initially designed to be performed in younger children of less than 10 years of age, whose sternum and cartilage is more flexible, there are successful series of Nuss treatment in patients well into their adult life.

==== Robicsek technique ====
In 1965, Francis Robicsek, based at Charlotte Memorial Hospital, now named Carolinas Medical Center in Charlotte, North Carolina, developed the Robicsek procedure. Each time the procedure is performed, it is individually tailored based on the extent and location of the deformity in the patient. The operation begins with an incision, no more than 4–6 centimeters, to the sternum. The pectoralis major muscles are then detached from the sternum. Using the upper limit of the sternal depression as a guide, the deformed cartilages are removed one by one, using sharp and blunt dissection. The lower tip of the sternum is then grabbed with a towel-clip and, using blunt dissection, is freed of tissue connections with the pericardium and the pleura. The sternum is then forcefully bent forward into a corrected position. To keep the sternum elevated, a piece of mesh is placed under the mobilized sternum and sutured under moderate tension bilaterally to the stumps of the ribs. The pectoralis muscles are united in front of the sternum, and the wound is closed. The Robicsek procedure is a single-stage procedure (one surgery only).

The purported advantage of this technique is that it is less invasive than the Ravitch technique, but critics have suggested that the relapse rate may be high due to cartilage and bone displaying memory phenomenon.

==== Wang procedure ====
The Wang procedure was invented by Dr. Wenlin Wang in 2018. While the Nuss procedure inserts a bar inside the chest cavity, the Wang procedure inverts this principle by attaching a bar to the outer surface of the sternum. Its benefits include less trauma, shorter recovery time, no risk of cardiac injury, and application to young children under the age of 5.

==== Pectus Up technique ====
In 2016, Carlos Bardají, a Barcelona-based pediatric surgeon, together with Lluís Cassou, a biomedical engineer, published a paper describing an extra-thoracic surgical procedure for the correction of pectus excavatum called Pectus up technique. A specially designed implant and traction hardware were developed specifically for the procedure.

In the Pectus up technique, a small hole is drilled into the sternum at the deepest point of the defect, and a double screw is driven into the hole. Then, a stainless steel implant is placed underneath the skin on top of the sternum and ribs, centered over the double screw. Traction tools are then used to lift the sternum up by the double screw using the implant and ribs for traction. Additional screws are then used to secure the implant onto the sternum, holding the sternum in the desired position. Optionally, stainless steel wire may be wrapped around the implant and ribs to further secure the implant in place.

Like the Nuss procedure, Pectus up technique requires follow-up surgery several years later to remove the implanted hardware once the sternum has permanently assumed its new position.

The implant and related hardware used in taulinoplasty is a proprietary product of Ventura Medical Technologies and is marketed as a surgical kit under the brand name Pectus UP.

Pectus up technique was developed to be an alternative to the Nuss procedure that eliminates the risks and drawbacks of entering the thorax. In particular, patients usually have shorter operating and recovery times and less post-operative pain than with the Nuss procedure.

=== Plastic surgery ===
==== Implants ====
The implant allows pectus excavatum to be treated from a purely morphological perspective. Today, it is used as a benchmark procedure as it is simple, reliable, and minimally invasive while offering aesthetically pleasing results. This procedure does not, however, claim to correct existing cardiac and respiratory problems which, in very rare cases, can be triggered by the pectus excavatum condition. For female patients, the potential resulting breast asymmetry can be partially or completely corrected by this procedure.

The process of creating a plaster-cast model, directly on the skin of the patient's thorax, can be used in the design of the implants. The evolution of medical imaging and CAD (computer-aided design) now allows customised 3D implants to be designed directly from the ribcage, therefore being much more precise, easier to place sub-pectorally and perfectly adapted to the shape of each patient. The implants are made of medical silicone rubber, which is resistant to wear and extremely durable (different from the silicone gel used in breast implants). They will last for life (apart from the case of adverse reactions) and are not visible externally.

The surgery is performed under general anesthesia and takes about an hour. The surgeon makes an incision of approximately seven centimetres, prepares the customised space in the chest, inserts the implant deep beneath the muscle, then closes the incision. Post-operative hospitalization is typically around three days.

The recovery after the surgery typically requires only mild pain relief. Post-operatively, a surgical dressing is required for several days and a compression vest for a month following the procedure. A check-up appointment is carried out after a week for puncture of seroma. If the surgery has minimal complications, the patient can resume normal activities quickly, returning to work after 15 days and participating in any sporting activities after three months.

==== Lipofilling ====
The "lipofilling" technique consists of sucking fat from the patient using a syringe with a large gauge needle (usually from the abdomen or the outer thighs), then, after centrifugation, re-injecting the fat cells beneath the skin into whichever hollow it is needed to fill. This technique is primarily used to correct small defects that may persist after conventional surgical treatment.

== Epidemiology ==
Pectus excavatum occurs in an estimated 1 in 150 to 1 in 1000 births, with male predominance (male-to-female ratio of 3:1). In 35% to 45% of cases, family members are affected.

== Notable cases ==
American Olympic swimmer Cody Miller (born 1992) opted not to have treatment for pectus excavatum, even though it limited his lung capacity. He earned a gold medal in 2016. Actor Joel Kinnaman underwent surgery prior to the filming of Altered Carbon, inserting two metal bars to push the sternum outward in order to correct the deformity. Others who are known to have this condition include English comedian and presenter Josh Widdicombe, YouTuber/streamer Ludwig Ahgren, and American actor Zach Woods, this in the latter case being noticeable in his shirtless scene in an episode of The Office (Season 8, episode 12). Dutch bodybuilder, actor and Muscle Meats CEO Olivier Richters, "The Dutch Giant", suffered from the condition before undergoing surgical correction.

Additionally, Eric Harris, an American mass murderer who perpetrated the Columbine High School massacre, had pectus excavatum. He had surgery at 12 and 13 to correct the deformity, but it was still visible during his autopsy.

== In non-human animals ==
Pectus excavatum is also known to occur in non-human animals, e.g. the Munchkin breed of cat. Some procedures used to treat the condition in animals have not been used in human treatments, such as the use of a cast with sutures wrapped around the sternum and the use of internal and external splints. These techniques are generally used in immature animals with flexible cartilage.

== See also ==
- Pectus carinatum
