= Nuss procedure =

Procedure for treating pectus excavatum

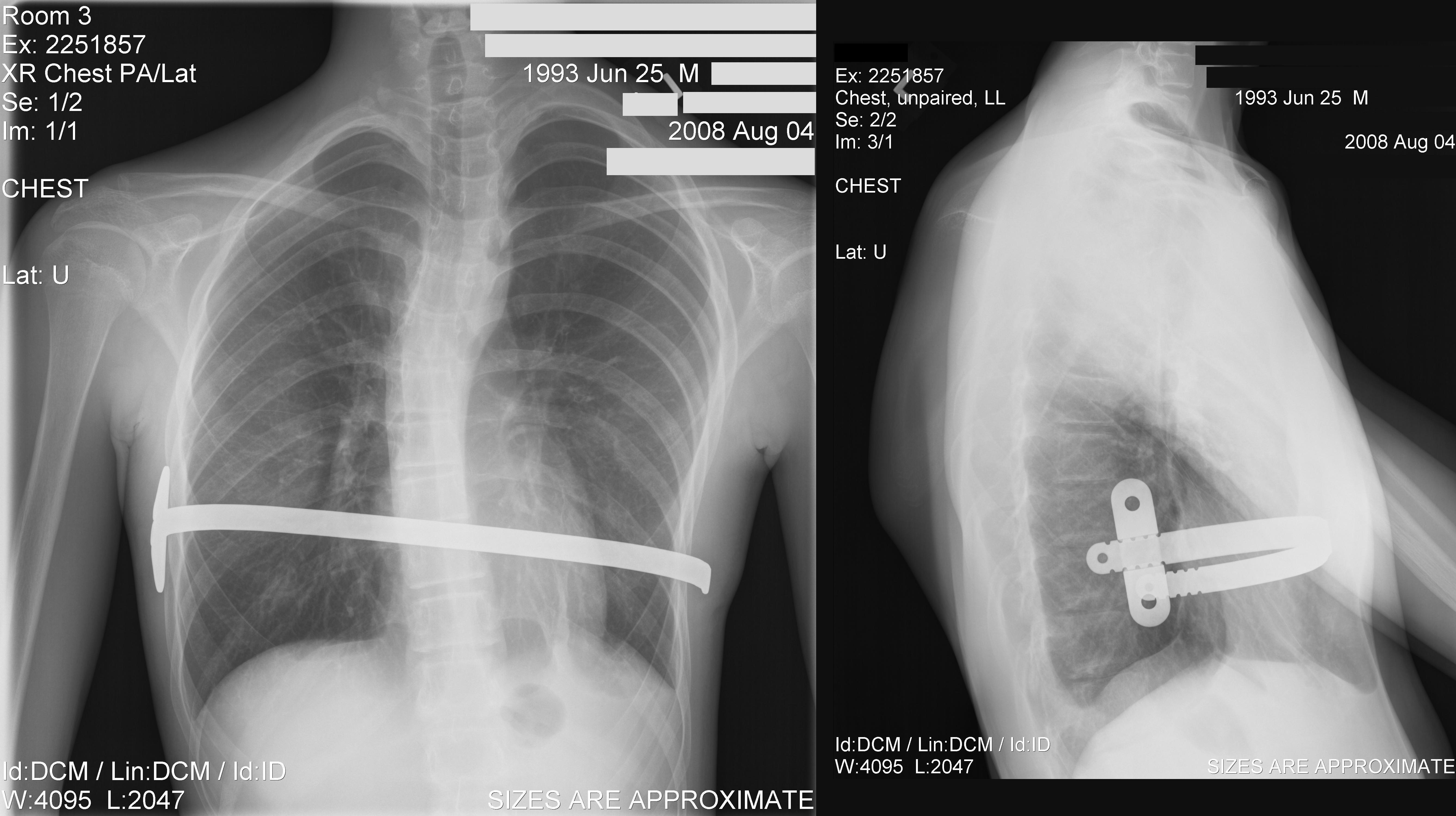
- X-Ray of a 15-year-old male after undergoing the procedure
- Specialty: Orthopedic

The Nuss procedure is a minimally invasive procedure, invented in 1987 by Dr. Donald Nuss and his colleagues, Dr. Daniel Croitoru and Dr. Robert Kelly, for treating pectus excavatum. He developed it at Children's Hospital of The King's Daughters, in Norfolk, Virginia. The operation typically takes approximately two hours.

Through two small incisions in the side of the chest, an introducer is pushed along posterior to the sternum and ribs, and anterior to the heart and lungs. Then a concave stainless steel bar is slipped under the sternum, through the incisions in the side of the chest. A third, smaller incision is made to insert a thoracoscope (small camera) used to help guide the bar. Taller patients, older patients, or patients requiring extensive correction may receive two or more bars. All bars may be placed through two incisions or additional incisions may be made. The bar is then flipped, and the sternum pops out. To support the bar and keep it in place, a metal plate called a stabilizer may be inserted with the bar on one side of the torso. PDS sutures may also be used in addition to the stabilizer. The stabilizer fits around the bar and into the ribcage. The bar and stabilizer are secured with sutures that dissolve in about six months.

Kevlar strings may also be attached to the lower ribcage to prevent costal flaring. This option is often not preferred by surgeons as it can cause extreme amounts of additional pain during recovery and up until the strings are removed.

Some surgeons have achieved excellent results using only pericostal sutures, without the use of stabilizers. For older children who have more ossified bones, an additional option the surgeon has is to make an incision across the sternum so the bar is attached with a wire to the sternum to avoid bar displacement. Older children's bones do not conform as easily to the bar, thus increasing the risk of bar displacement, so the wire attaching the bar directly to the sternum may help avoid a second surgery to correct bar displacement.

Eventually, the bar is secured with muscle tissue that regrows during the recovery time. Although initially recommended only for younger patients, the Nuss procedure is now commonly used on patients in their thirties and forties with excellent results.

Postoperative evaluation indicates a significant improvement in pulmonary function studies and a high proportion of patients report improvements in well-being and an increase in exercise tolerance.

Although this procedure is categorized as "minimally invasive", post-operative pain control can be quite challenging, thus requiring multi-modal pain management including epidural anesthetics. Nurses who attend these patients post operation generally concur that this operation is one of the more difficult recoveries of any operations for children.

== Sternal elevation ==
The retrosternal passage performed in the Nuss procedure carries a high risk of damaging the heart. This is why multiple sternal elevation systems have been developed to increase the space between the heart and the sternum in order to pass the thoracoplasty rod more safely.

== Recovery ==
Recovery time is generally four to five days as an in-patient, depending on the patient age, activity level, co-morbidities and post-operative complications (if any), followed by time at home to overcome the pain and to let the bar settle into place. Sleep will be hampered because of the pain, discomfort and inability to sleep on either side of the body. Breathing can be difficult because of the stiffness of the bar and post-operative pain, but this generally improves within a few weeks to a month. Patients younger than fifteen often require only two to four weeks at home after being discharged from the hospital for recovery. However, older children and adults typically require a greater recovery time due to the increased ossification (and thus decreased flexibility) of their bones.

In this case, the difficulty and length of recovery should be carefully considered prior to making the decision to undergo the operation, as the limitations to lifestyle, functionality and comfort can be dramatic for many months. This cannot be understated for older children, which is why many doctors do not recommend this procedure unless medically necessary (i.e. not for cosmetic reasons). Fully grown adults may require from four weeks to many months before they can resume normal activities, including work. For six to twenty-four hours after the operation, the patient generally will have a Foley catheter to minimize risk of movement that could displace bar, and because the epidural can interfere with normal urination.

Studies using sonography have shown post-operative changes in many patients such as an acute angulation of the costochondral junction and rib fractures near the pectus bar. Such changes occurred especially in patients who were older than 10 years or who underwent a high elevation of the sternum.

For six weeks, physical activity should be limited (i.e. no running or strenuous physical activity, and lifting is limited to ten pounds or less). Walking for exercise and breathing exercises aid in recovery. It is sometimes suggested that weight-training should be limited or eliminated for up to three months. It is also recommended that any sports where contact may occur should be avoided. However, aerobic sports are, in fact, encouraged, as results after bar removal are best maintained in patients who have stimulated their cardiopulmonary systems while the bar was in place. The restoration of the patients' physical abilities can take up to ten months. However, in the majority of cases, patients report a return to their preoperative physical state after roughly six months. Many patients choose to return to work at this point. Despite this physical recovery, patients are recommended to avoid more physical situations such as contact sports until after the bar has been removed.

Many Pectus Excavatum patients exhibit psychological symptoms associated with the cosmetic appearance of their disorder. For many, it is the driving force behind undergoing the Nuss procedure. The recovery from these psychological symptoms can also take some time, though many patients report improvements in confidence and self-esteem after only a few weeks, once the effects of the surgery can be noticed. Ultimately, almost all patients report a noticeable improvement in their confidence and body image after they have completely recovered from the operation.

== Bar removal ==
After a period of two to four years, the surgical stainless steel bar is removed from the patient's chest. This procedure lasts approximately ninety minutes. The length of time that the patient stays at the hospital following the bar removal procedure varies, depending on the amount of new bone growth surrounding the bar. Accordingly, the length of time may range from a few hours to several days, or up to one week.

== Complications ==
While the minimally invasive Nuss procedure is generally considered safe and effective, like any surgical intervention, it carries potential complications. Early experiences with the procedure indicate generally low complication rates. One specific complication that can occur is residual pneumothorax, which refers to a small amount of air remaining in the chest cavity after surgery. These cases are often mild and typically resolve spontaneously within 24 hours.

Iatrogenic damage to the heart and lungs during the procedure is a concern. Scopes (cameras) are often utilized by the surgical team to minimize this risk. There is still an extremely minor risk of abrasion or puncture.

One of the most significant mechanical complications following the Nuss procedure is bar displacement or rotation, which can lead to recurrence of the deformity and often necessitates reoperation. While various stabilization techniques have been developed over time, including the use of bar stabilizers and pericostal sutures, ongoing efforts focus on further minimizing this risk.

A key strategy to enhance bar stability is the primary placement of two or more pectus bars. Studies have shown that using two bars during the initial repair can significantly minimize the risk of bar movement requiring reoperation. For instance, one study found that while 15.5% of patients with a single bar required reoperation for displacement, no patients who initially received two bars needed reoperative intervention for a displaced bar. Pioneering centers in the field of minimally invasive pectus excavatum repair have further refined techniques to enhance stability and minimize complications. For instance, Clínica Mi Pectus in Argentina, and the Mayo Clinic in Phoenix, Arizona, along with other leading institutions globally, have embraced the practice of using two or more pectus bars during the primary repair. This approach distributes the corrective forces more effectively and is associated with a significantly reduced risk of bar rotation or displacement requiring reoperation.

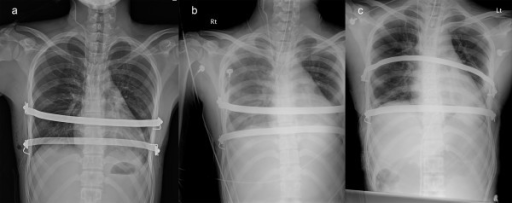
Iatrogenic hemothorax resulting from the Nuss procedure. A showing no hemothorax, b showing hemothorax, and c showing resolution after treatment.

Air in the chest (pneumothorax) is one of the more frequent complications. A chest tube is often required, but aggressive breathing exercises and close monitoring may be adequate.

With the use of stabilizers and PDS sutures, bar displacement rarely occurs. If bar displacement does occur, it can be quite painful and usually requires some sort of intervention: either bar removal, or repositioning of the bar with some sort of bar fixation. Patients should understand prior to the surgery that if bar displacement occurs soon after surgery, a second surgery will be immediately required which comes with an even more difficult recovery as the patient is already weakened and in pain. High impact trauma, such as car accidents, can dislodge the bars, causing extreme pain. This is the reason for the restriction on driving, because a sudden defensive maneuver, such as a jerk of the steering wheel, could dislodge the bar up to six weeks directly after the surgery.

Other complications which may occur include hemothorax, pleural effusion, pericarditis, wound infection, pneumonia and acquired scoliosis. Vigorous incentive spirometry is used to prevent pneumonia. Some patients are allergic to one of the components of stainless steel. As a result, allergy testing is now routinely done prior to surgery. In the event of an allergy, a titanium bar will be used.

Older children may also struggle with adjusting to living in their changed bodies during the several months of healing due to the pain and limitations.
