= Pectus carinatum =

- Other names: Pigeon chest, pectus carinatum, bird chest, convex chest, keel chest
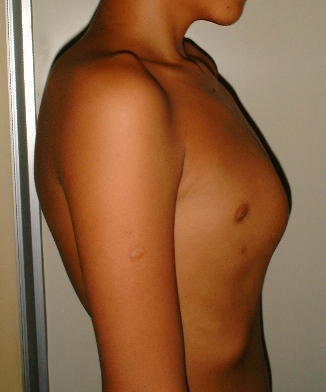
- Side view of a child with pectus carinatum
- Pronunciation: /ˌpɛktəs ˌkærɪˈneɪtəm, -ˈnɑːtəm/
- Specialty: Orthopedics
- Complications: Marfan syndrome; Ehlers-Danlos syndrome; self-esteem issues; body dysmorphia; back pain
- Types: Chondrogladiolar prominence; Chondromanubrial prominence
- Causes: Unknown
- Treatment: Bracing; surgery
- Prognosis: Excellent
- Frequency: 1 in 1,000 children

Pectus carinatum, also called pigeon chest or pigeon breast, is a malformation of the chest characterized by a protrusion of the sternum and ribs. It is distinct from the related malformation pectus excavatum.

Pectus carinatum has an estimated prevalence of approximately 1 in 1,000 to 1,500 live births, though specific figures vary geographically. It is generally less common than pectus excavatum. The condition is more frequently observed in males, with a male-to-female ratio ranging from 4:1 to 7:1. It typically becomes more noticeable during periods of rapid growth, such as early adolescence.

== Signs and symptoms ==
People with pectus carinatum usually develop normal hearts and lungs, but the malformation may prevent these from functioning optimally. In moderate to severe cases of pectus carinatum, the chest wall is rigidly held outward. Thus, respiration is inefficient, and the individual needs to use the accessory muscles for respiration, rather than normal chest muscles, during strenuous exercise. This negatively affects gas exchange and causes a decrease in stamina. Children with pectus malformations often tire sooner than their peers due to shortness of breath and fatigue. Commonly concurrent is mild to moderate asthma.

Some children with pectus carinatum also have scoliosis (i.e., curvature of the spine). Some have mitral valve prolapse, a condition in which the heart mitral valve functions abnormally. Connective tissue disorders involving structural abnormalities of the major blood vessels and heart valves are also seen. Although rarely seen, some children have other connective tissue disorders, including arthritis, visual impairment, and healing impairment.

Apart from the possible physiologic consequences, pectus malformations can have a significant psychological impact.

A less common variant of pectus carinatum is pectus arcuatum (also called type 2 pectus excavatum, chondromanubrial malformation or Currarino–Silverman syndrome or pouter pigeon malformation), which produces a manubrial and upper sternal protrusion, particularly also at the sternal angle. Pectus arcuate is often confused with a combination of pectus carinatum and pectus excavatum, but in pectus arcuate a protrusion of the costal cartilages characterizes the visual appearance and there is no depression of the sternum.

== Causes ==
Pectus carinatum is an overgrowth of costal cartilage, causing the sternum to protrude forward. It primarily occurs among four patient groups, and males are more frequently affected than females. Most commonly, pectus carinatum develops in 11-to-14-year-old pubertal males undergoing a growth spurt. Some parents report that their child's pectus carinatum seemingly popped up overnight. The second most common is the presence of pectus carinatum at or shortly after birth. The condition may be evident in newborns as a rounded anterior chest wall. The outward sternal protrusion becomes more pronounced as the child reaches age 2 or 3. Pectus carinatum can also be caused by vitamin D deficiency in children (Rickets) due to deposition of unmineralized osteoid. The least common is a pectus carinatum malformation following open-heart surgery or in children with poorly controlled bronchial asthma.

Pectus carinatum is generally a solitary, non-syndromic abnormality. However, the condition may be present in association with other syndromes: Turner syndrome, Noonan syndrome, Loeys–Dietz syndrome, Marfan syndrome, Ehlers–Danlos syndrome, Morquio syndrome, trisomy 18, trisomy 21, homocystinuria, osteogenesis imperfecta, multiple lentigines syndrome (LEOPARD syndrome), Sly syndrome (mucopolysaccharidosis type VII), and scoliosis.

== Diagnosis ==
Pectus carinatum can be easily diagnosed by certain tests like a CT scan (2D and 3D). It may then be found that the rib cage is in a normal structure.

The diagnosis of pectus carinatum is primarily based on a clinical physical examination. This chest wall deformity is visually characterized by an anterior protrusion of the sternum and ribs, often giving the chest a distinct "keel chest" or "pigeon breast" appearance. The "typical chondrogladiolar pectus carinatum" refers to the common presentation involving the lower and middle sternum.

== Treatment ==
=== External bracing technique ===
Particularly in growing adolescents with flexible chest walls, non-surgical management is the first-line treatment. This primarily involves external bracing. The brace applies continuous, external pressure to the prominent areas of the chest, gradually reshaping the cartilages. Treatment success depends on the patient's age (younger patients with more flexible cartilage respond better), consistent brace wear (typically 12–23 hours per day), and the severity of the deformity. The duration of bracing usually ranges from 6 months to 2 years, often continuing until skeletal maturity. Regular follow-up with the bracing specialist is crucial to monitor progress and adjust the brace as needed.

One notable system used in non-surgical management is the Dynamic Compression System (DCS) or the Dynamic Compressor System (FMF System), the FMF System has treated over 20,000 patients globally. This system utilizes a custom-made aluminum brace with a pressure measurement mechanism to ensure effective and safe correction. Studies have shown the FMF Dynamic Compression System to be an efficient, non-invasive treatment with low morbidity for typical chondrogladiolar pectus carinatum. For instance, a study involving 104 patients under 18 years old reported a positive qualitative assessment in 95.5% of cases, with an average correction time of 8.8 months and maintenance time of 8 months. Another study involving 208 patients highlighted the system's effectiveness and its ability to minimize complications like skin lesions or poor results through precise pressure measurement.

Willingness to wear the brace as required is essential for the success of this treatment approach. The brace works in much the same way as orthodontics (braces that correct the alignment of teeth). The brace consists of front and back compression plates anchored to aluminum bars. These bars are bound together by a tightening mechanism, which varies from brace to brace. This device is easily hidden under clothing and must be worn for 14 to 24 hours daily.

Bracing is becoming more popular over surgery for pectus carinatum, mostly because it eliminates the risks accompanying it. The prescribing of bracing as a treatment for pectus carinatum has 'trickled down' from both pediatric and thoracic surgeons to the family physician and pediatricians again due to its lower risks and well documented, very highly successful results. The pectus carinatum guideline of 2012 of the American Pediatric Surgical Association has stated: "As reconstructive therapy for the compliant pectus [carinatum] malformation, nonoperative compressive orthotic bracing is usually an appropriate first line of therapy as it does not preclude the operative option. For appropriate candidates, orthotic bracing of chest wall malformations can reasonably be expected to prevent the worsening of the malformation and often results in a lasting correction of the malformation. Orthotic bracing is often successful in prepubertal children whose chest wall is compliant. Expert opinion suggests that the noncompliant chest wall malformation or significant asymmetry of the pectus carinatum malformation caused by a concomitant excavatum-type malformation may not respond to orthotic bracing."

Regular supervision during the bracing period is required for optimal results. Adjustments may be needed to the brace as the child grows and the pectus improves.

Studies have demonstrated high effectiveness rates for non-surgical dynamic compression. Patient compliance is a critical factor for successful bracing outcomes. Research indicates that factors such as family support significantly contribute to brace treatment success. Novel wireless, real-time monitoring systems are being developed to address and improve patient adherence.

=== Surgical ===
For patients with severe pectus carinatum, surgery may be necessary. However, bracing could and may still be the first line of treatment. Some severe cases treated with bracing may result in enough improvement that the patient is happy with the outcome and may not want surgery afterward. Surgery would be the next step if bracing should fail for whatever reason. The two most common procedures are the Ravitch technique and the Reverse Nuss procedure.

A modified Ravitch technique uses bioabsorbable material and postoperative bracing, and in some cases a diced rib cartilage graft technique.

The Nuss was developed by Donald Nuss at the Children's Hospital of the King's Daughters in Norfolk, Va. The Nuss is primarily used for Pectus Excavatum but has recently been revised in some PC cases, mainly when the malformation is symmetrical.

== Prognosis ==
Pectus malformations usually become more severe during adolescent growth and may worsen throughout adulthood. The secondary effects, such as scoliosis and cardiovascular and pulmonary conditions, may worsen with advancing age.

Most insurance companies no longer consider chest wall malformations like pectus carinatum to be purely cosmetic conditions. While the psychological impact of any malformation is real and must be addressed, the physiological concerns must take precedence. The possibility of lifelong cardiopulmonary difficulties is serious enough to warrant a visit to a thoracic surgeon.

== Epidemiology ==
Pectus malformations are rare; about 1 in 400 people have a pectus disorder.

Pectus carinatum is rarer than pectus excavatum, another pectus disorder, occurring in only about 20% of people with pectus malformations. About four out of five patients are males.

== See also ==
- Barrel chest (convex, often healthy)
- Pectus excavatum (concave, sunken)

== Citations ==
=== Sources ===
- Desmarais, Thomas J.; Keller, Martin S. (June 2013). "Pectus carinatum". Current Opinion in Pediatrics. 25 (3): 375–381. doi:10.1097/MOP.0b013e3283604088. ISSN 1040-8703. PMID 23657247.
