= Steichen =

Steichen is a surname. Notable people with the surname include:

- Donna Steichen, American journalist
- Edward Steichen (1879–1973), Luxembourgish-American photographer and artist
- Mary Calderone (1904–1998), American physician and public health advocate; daughter of Edward
- Félicien M. Steichen (1926–2011), American surgeon
- Félicien Steichen
- Félix Steichen
- Gerald Steichen (born 1963), American conductor, pianist, and actor
- Joseph Steichen
- Jules Steichen (1902–1977), Luxembourgish boxer
- Marianne Steichen
- Marie Steichen (died 2006), American politician
- René Steichen (born 1942), Luxembourgish politician and jurist
- Shane Steichen (born 1985), American football player and coach

== See also ==
- Stade Demy Steichen, a football stadium in Steinfort, Luxembourg
- Steichen (crater), a crater on Mercury
