= Andrew Peitzman =

American surgeon

Andrew B. Peitzman is an American surgeon currently the Distinguished Professor of Surgery and Mark M. Ravitch Chair in Surgery at University of Pittsburgh.
