= Félicien M. Steichen =

American surgeon (1926–2011)

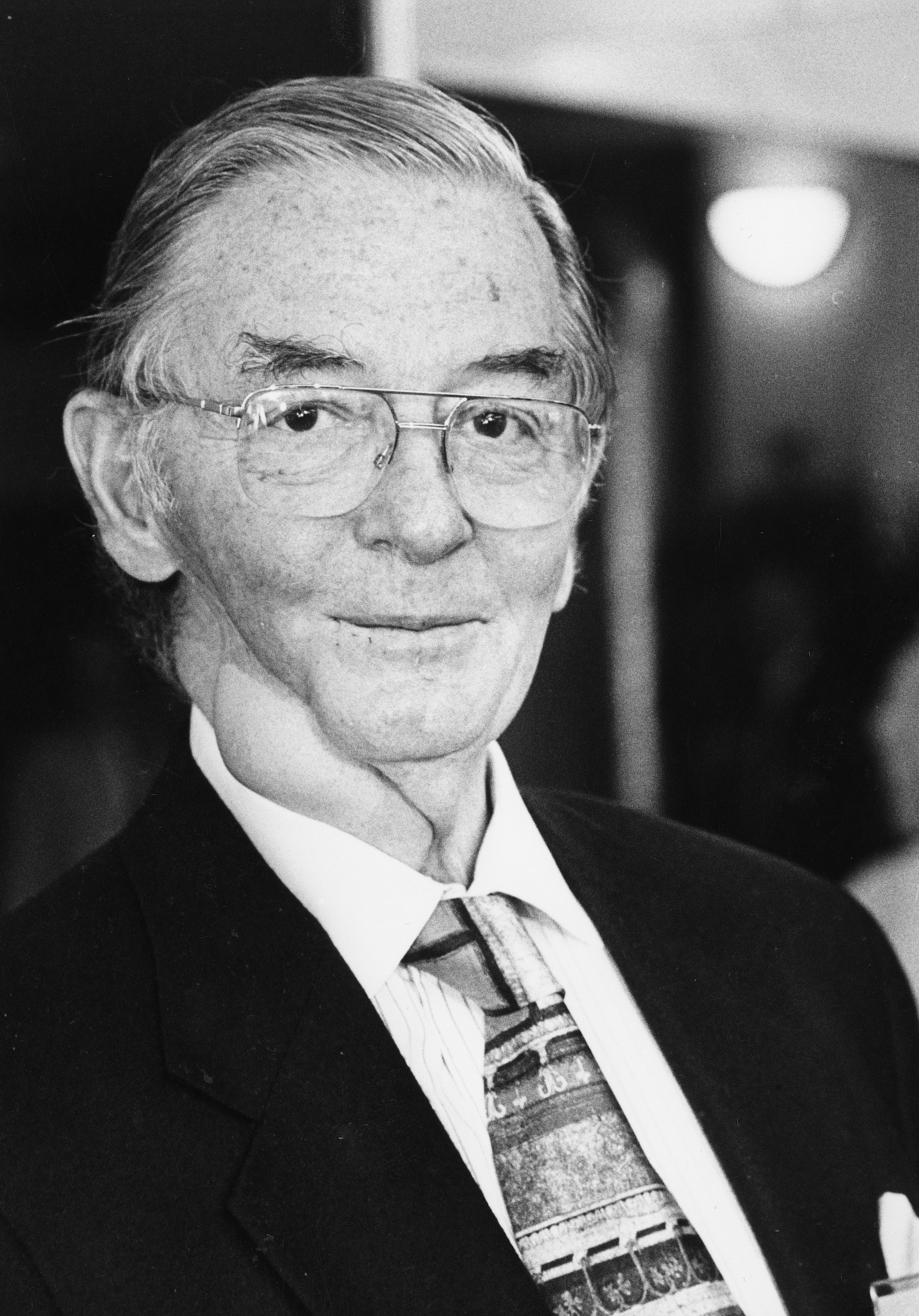
- Born: October 13, 1926; Luxembourg City, Luxembourg
- Died: June 27, 2011 (aged 84); Brignogan-Plage, France
- Education: Univ. of Lausanne Medical School
- Years active: 50
- Medical career
- Profession: Surgeon
- Institutions: New York Medical College, University of Pittsburgh School of Medicine, Johns Hopkins School of Medicine
- Research: Surgical Stapling, Minimally-Invasive Surgery

Félicien M. Steichen (October 13, 1926 – June 27, 2011) was a Luxembourgish-born American surgeon and Professor of Surgery. He was a pioneer in the development and use of surgical staples. He and Mark M. Ravitch are considered the fathers of modern surgical stapling. Steichen was also noted for his contributions to the development of minimally-invasive surgery.

== Early life ==
Born the second son and third of five children of Joseph Steichen, a civil servant, and Anne Gonner, a Homemaker, Steichen grew up at 11 rue de la Semois, in the Péitruss (Pétrusse) Valley neighborhood of Luxembourg City, in the Grand Duchy of Luxembourg. In 1946, he graduated from the Athénée.

== Medical and surgical training ==
Steichen studied medicine at the University of Lausanne Medical School, from which he graduated first in his class in 1953. Shortly thereafter, he was offered a one-year surgical internship at Lakewood Hospital, near Cleveland, Ohio, by Director of Surgery Carl Hahn. (Note: Hahn had been a surgeon in General George S. Patton's Third Infantry Division (Third Army) when it liberated Luxembourg in September, 1944.) Steichen arrived in New York on September 22, 1953, and in Cleveland shortly thereafter. (Note: Steichen arrived in the United States on the MS Black Heron of the Black Diamond Shipping Corporation, sailing from Rotterdam to New York from Sept. 12 – 22, 1953.)

From 1954 to 1959, Steichen was surgical resident at Baltimore City Hospital ("BCH," now Bayview Medical Center), led by Director of Surgery Mark M. Ravitch. He was Chief Resident from 1959 to 1961, and then appointed fellow in surgery at the Johns Hopkins School of Medicine. (Note: Ravitch was Blalock's chief resident twice, both before and after World War II. He edited The Papers of Alfred Blalock, published by the Johns Hopkins Press in 1966.) At BCH, Steichen and Ravitch also developed a trusting, collegial relationship that extended beyond the hospital ward and lasted for 35 years.

== Developing modern surgical stapling ==
=== Baltimore City Hospital ===
In late 1958, Steichen, Ravitch, and Ravitch's then-current chief resident, Peter Weil, began laboratory experiments with stapling instruments. The staplers they used had been procured by Mark Ravitch in Moscow during a medical experts' visit to the Soviet Union earlier in 1958 that was unrelated to stapling. In early 1959, the BCH team began to use the staplers clinically. In 139 pulmonary lobectomies and segmentectomies for tuberculosis through 1961, the BCH team showed a significant reduction in life-threatening complication of bronchial fistula, (Note: Bronchial fistulae are abnormal, and very dangerous, passageways that develop between the bronchus and the membranes that line the lungs (pleura), often as a result of surgery for lung cancer.) from 14% using manual closures to 4.6% using staplers. This work was published in the Journal of Thoracic and Cardiovascular Surgery, Steichen's first appearance as a major author of a scientific paper.

In May, 1961, Steichen finished his residency and returned to set up a private practice in Luxembourg. In July, 1961, he wed Michèle Steichen (née Queinnec), to whom he remained married for the rest of his life.

=== Lincoln Hospital: establishing the viability of surgical stapling ===
In 1963, after two years in Luxembourg and at the U.S. Air Force Hospital in Wiesbaden, Germany, he was recruited to Lincoln Hospital and the Albert Einstein College of Medicine, in New York City, by Peter Weil, his friend, colleague and fellow former chief resident at Baltimore City Hospital. Shortly after returning to the United States, he became an American citizen.

Steichen and Ravitch were the first to understand the importance of the modern instruments, (Note: Mark Ravitch wrote: "We began experimental and clinical evaluation [of the Russian instruments] at once on returning home [from the trip to the Soviet Union during which Ravitch obtained some of these instruments].") (Note: Ravitch: "Interestingly enough, a number of American manufacturers, knowing of our interest, visited our laboratories and operating rooms to see how the staplers performed, but for one reason or another decided there was no future in stapling – to their later-expressed regret!") and the first to develop many of the procedures in which the instruments could be applied. (Note: Ravitch: "[We then moved] into the experimental and clinical use of the American instruments as they became available.") (Note: "The introduction of staplers into North America by Ravitch and Steichen has markedly facilitated intestinal anastomoses.") (Note: "In the 1960s, Steichen and Ravitch introduced stapling instruments.") (Note: "The use of these [Soviet] instruments has been described by Ravitch... and Steichen.") In that sense, they can legitimately be called the Fathers of Modern Stapling, not just American Stapling. Ravitch and Steichen were always scrupulous about crediting their predecessors in the development of mechanical sutures; indeed, if the names Hultl and von Petz survive, it is largely because Ravitch and Steichen habitually cited their elegant and brilliant work in all their major monographs. Yet large-scale applicability of mechanical suturing did not come about until Ravitch and Steichen began developing techniques for modern instruments and popularizing them in the surgical community through their writings, films and teaching seminars. As the Surgeon and Historian, A.P. Naef, has stated: "[in 1963,] extended clinical use and potential industrial production [of surgical staplers] were far from obvious." (Note: Not only were the original Soviet instruments unwieldy and extremely difficult to clean, assemble and load, there was also virtually no accepted experimental and clinical precedent to show that they were preferable – or even safe – to use over hand sutures. For over 150 years, Surgeons had known that mechanical wound closure might provide reduced operating times, less tissue manipulation, and greater consistency in contrast to hand suturing. Much work had been done with compression rings in the United States and France, but the idea of using staples across a wider area of tissue became the obsession of Surgeons in Central Europe in the fifty years before World War II. Humer Hültl, Aladar von Petz and Hans Friedrich were associated with progressively lighter and less cumbersome instruments; the Friedrich instrument is especially striking because its design presages that of the Soviet thoracic stapler and the American "TA" stapler in form. But mechanical devices were unwieldy, and they took too long to prepare for use. Too many parts had to be cleaned, assembled, and loaded; not least the staples themselves, which were individually inserted, by hand, into their grooves on the instrument. As importantly, any new instruments would have to be tested in the laboratory and clinic, adapted to existing surgical procedures, and used in entirely new operations.)

Two events served to catalyze the development of modern surgical stapling: at Lincoln Hospital, Weil gave Steichen full freedom to use the hospital's surgical laboratory to focus on testing and developing surgical stapling. In Baltimore, Mark Ravitch met with an Entrepreneur named Leon Hirsch (later Founder of the United States Surgical Corporation) about whether surgical stapling could be commercially viable. The result was an informal group, comprising Ravitch, Steichen, Hirsch and eventual Executive Vice President of U.S. Surgical Turi Josefsen. Hirsch has called this group "a model of the way in which the private sector and Academia can work together." Ravitch and Hirsch focused on de-constructing the Soviet instruments and creating American prototypes. (Note: The key change was to incorporate all moving parts into a single, disposable cartridge, thereby solving the loading and assembly issues. These "cartridges... would be usable in any given series of instruments, and be pre-loaded, pre-sterilized, color-coded for size, and disposable, in addition to containing all the moving parts and reduc[ing] the stapler to a shell that could house, position and activate the staples contained in a cartridge.") Steichen's priority became to test the new instruments, adapt them to surgical procedures, and develop new operations for their use. Initial prototypes for the workhorses of surgical stapling, the TA and GIA staplers, were created by 1964.

At Lincoln, from 1963 to 1969, Steichen was the first to study, then apply clinically, many of the surgical stapling techniques that are in routine use today. These include the first:

- clinical functional end-to-end anastomosis;
- clinical gastrectomy using a stapling instrument;
- clinical pulmonary lobectomy using the GIA stapling instrument;
- clinical Hunt-Lawrence and Paulino Roux-en-Y pouches using a stapling instrument, with Fernando Paulino in attendance.

The functional end-to-end anastomosis, in particular, is credited to Steichen. (Note: "The functional end-to-end anastomosis, devised by Steichen ...") (Note: "We have modified Steichen's method of anastomosing ileum to colon...(Authors then cite to Steichen's 1968 article in Surgery)") (Note: "The stapled enteroenterostomy created in Roux-en-Y procedures is a functional end-to-side anastomosis that is performed using the same technique that was described by Steichen (authors cite here to Steichen's 1968 article in Surgery") (Note: "A functional end-to-end anastomosis,'first described in the 1960s'.. (Authors then cite to Steichen's 1968 article in Surgery)") (Note: "Stapled anastomoses should be performed in a side-to-side, functional end-to-end fashion 'as described by Steichen and Ravitch.' (Authors then cite to a page in Steichen and Ravitch's monograph, "Stapling in Surgery," that cites Steichen's 1968 article on the Functional End-to-End Anastomosis in Surgery.)") (Note: "La técnica de anastomosis intestinal terminal funcional introducida por Ravitch y Steichen... (The technique of a functional end-to-end anastomosis of the small bowel, introduced by Ravitch and Steichen...) Note: authors credit both Ravitch and Steichen, but then cite to Steichen's 1968 article in Surgery) only.")

The team also:

- studied use of the GIA stapling instrument inserted from above and below to avoid any cul-de-sac at all in the Duhamel Procedure;
- developed esophageal coloplasty using the stapling instruments;
- started the practice of making permanent tube gastrostomies with the GIA instrument;
- started the practice of transecting and closing bowel with the GIA instrument.

The six years from 1963 to 1969 mark the transformation of surgical stapling from a curiosity, practiced in almost no hospitals outside of the Soviet Union, to the technological vanguard in wound closure.

=== Geneva: the First Use of Modern Staplers in Europe ===
Steichen finished his period at Albert Einstein with a Sabbatical year in Switzerland, as visiting professor at the University of Geneva Medical School and in the Division of Cardiovascular Surgery of the Hôpital Cantonal de Genève from 1969 to 1970. During that year, Steichen introduced the new American staplers into clinical practice in Europe, performing a number of successful surgical interventions at the Hôpital Cantonal.

== The University of Pittsburgh Medical Center ==
Steichen returned to the United States in 1970 to be associate professor, then professor, of surgery at the University of Pittsburgh School of Medicine and associate surgeon-in-chief at Montefiore Hospital of Pittsburgh, University of Pittsburgh Medical Center. In both capacities, he joined again with Ravitch, now professor of surgery and chief of surgery at Montefiore.

In Pittsburgh, Steichen focused his writings on the use of staplers in complex gastro-intestinal operations. He focused particularly on the esophagus, as well as gastric (stomach) reconstructions, intestinal pouches, and operations in the lowest parts of the pelvis. When U.S. Surgical Corporation's EEA circular stapler came on line in 1979, surgeons now possessed an instrument that could accomplish – in hard-to-access places – what hand suturing (for all but the most skilled surgeons) could not. Steichen and Ravitch were the first to describe its use in many operations on the esophagus, the stomach and the junction of the intestine and rectum.

=== Workshops ===
From 1973 to 1986, Steichen and Ravitch organized post-graduate workshops in surgical stapling in Pittsburgh. Each of the 26 workshops trained 40 surgeons and 20 operating room nurses, or more than 1,000 surgeons and 500 nurses in total.

=== Multi-media ===
Steichen was one of the first surgeons to film and narrate his operations. These films were used as teaching tools at the Montefiore Hospital auditorium during the Pitt workshops, by medical schools, and by U.S. Surgical's Education Department to train sales representatives for the company. Ten of the seventeen films he created are in the library of the American College of Surgeons.

== New York Medical College and Lenox Hill Hospital ==
In 1978, Steichen became professor of surgery at the New York Medical College and director of surgery at Lenox Hill Hospital in New York City. He remained professor of surgery at NYMC until 2008, then was named an emeritus professor. He was Director of Surgery at Lenox Hill Hospital until 1987, when he stepped down to become Attending Surgeon at Lenox Hill and at Westchester Medical Center, in Valhalla, New York.

== Writings ==
Between 1984 and 1991, Steichen compiled his work in surgical stapling in three books written with Mark M. Ravitch. The eminent surgeon, Louis R.M. DelGuercio, has called these books "the three seminal works in surgical stapling." Stapling in Surgery has been called the "original monograph describing the application of mechanical stapling devices to gastrointestinal surgery." It marks the definitive exposition of stapling technique in most general and thoracic surgery. Principles and Practice of Surgical Stapling compiles the contributions of "approximately 40 participants in the International Symposium [that Steichen and Ravitch had organized in Pittsburgh in] 1986, and covers the use of staples in esophageal, gastric, colorectal and thoracic surgery." The third book, Current Practice of Surgical Stapling is a history of, and compilation of the state of the art in, surgical stapling.

== Influence ==
Steichen was the first to bring surgical stapling to Europe, in Geneva from 1969 to 1970. He invited students and surgeons from Europe and North Africa to come to Pittsburgh or NYMC to learn about surgical stapling.

Steichen travelled to Europe to demonstrate surgical stapling technique and to share his knowledge. In 1978, he and Mark Ravitch travelled to Taipei, Kuala Lumpur, and Tokyo to spread stapling technique in Asia. In 1982, Steichen travelled to El Salvador to work with surgeons there on stapling techniques. By 1984, he was a principal participant in international symposia devoted exclusively to stapling, as at the University of Amsterdam or the University of Düsseldorf, and later, at Brive-la-Gaillarde, and Biarritz, France.

The Pitt Workshops were eventually transformed into the international symposia on stapling. The second such international symposium (and First European Congress on Surgical Stapling), organized (Note: "...the 'Second Symposium and First European Congress on Stapling' [was] organized in 1988 in Luxembourg by [Ravitch] and Felicien M. Steichen.") by Steichen and Roger Welter of Luxembourg, was held on the premises of the European Parliament in Luxembourg from June 2 to 4, 1988. This was a personal triumph for Steichen, but also a coming of age for surgical stapling. Over 500 surgeons attended the Congress from all over the world, but especially from Europe. The Congress was successful in its aim of spreading surgical stapling know-how "in all countries worldwide," since it attracted attendees from Eastern and Western Europe, China, Japan, Australia, and North and South America, and offered them both scientific and laboratory sessions on stapling.

For his pioneering work in stapling, and for teaching stapling techniques in other countries, Steichen was made an Honorary Member of both the German Society for Surgery and the French Academy of Surgery.

=== Minimally-invasive surgery ===
Steichen contributed to the newly emerging field of minimally invasive surgery (MIS) in three ways: In 1993, Steichen became the first director of the new Institute for Minimally-Invasive Surgery at St. Agnes Hospital, in White Plains, New York. This was a specialty-care center that trained a generation of surgical fellows in MIS, many of whom went on to establish their own practices or create specialty units in MIS in their own hospitals. In 1994, Steichen and Roger Welter co-edited a compendium of state of the art in these new techniques: Minimally-Invasive Surgery and New Technology, containing contributions from over 100 authors. In 2001, he co-edited, and translated a large portion of, Minimally-Invasive Abdominal Surgery, a surgical textbook and atlas with over 90 authors, containing a "superb" blend of laparoscopic techniques and three-dimensional drawings explaining these techniques.

== Books ==
Steichen authored or co-authored 18 books, 50 book chapters, and 3 monographs.

- Kremer, Karl, Werner Platzer, Hans Wilhelm Schreiber and Félicien M. Steichen, Minimally Invasive Abdominal Surgery, Thieme New York, New York, 2001. ISBN 3-13-108191-0 (GTV) and 0-86577-639-3 (TNY). (Authorized translation of the German edition of Minimal-invasive Chirurgie, vol. 7/2 of Kremer, Lierse, Platzer & Schreiber, Eds., Chirurgische Operationslehre, Georg Thieme Verlag, Stuttgart, 2001.
- Ravitch, Mark M. and Félicien M. Steichen, Atlas of General Thoracic Surgery, W.B. Saunders Company, Philadelphia, 1988. ISBN 0-7216-7474-7.
- Ravitch, Mark M. and Félicien M. Steichen, Current Practice of Surgical Stapling, Lea & Febiger, Philadelphia, 1991. ISBN 0-8121-1328-4.
- Ravitch, Mark M. and Félicien M. Steichen, Principles and Practice of Surgical Stapling, Year Book Medical Publishers, Chicago, 1987. ISBN 0-8151-7150-1.
- Steichen, Félicien M. and Mark M. Ravitch, Stapling in Surgery, Year Book Medical Publishers, Inc., Chicago, 1984. ISBN 0-8151-7108-0.
- Steichen, Félicien M. and Roger Welter, eds., Minimally Invasive Surgery and New Technology, Quality Medical Publishing, Inc., St. Louis, 1994. ISBN 0-942219-51-1.
- Steichen, Félicien M. and Ruth A. Wolsch, Mechanical Sutures in Operations on the Small & Large Intestine and Rectum, Cine-Med, Inc., Woodbury, Connecticut, 2004. ISBN 978-0-974935829.
- Steichen, Félicien M. and Ruth A. Wolsch, Mechanical Sutures in Operations on the Lung, Cine-Med, Inc., Woodbury, Connecticut, 2008. ISBN 978-0974935850.
- Steichen, Félicien M. and Ruth A. Wolsch, Mechanical Sutures in Operations on the Esophagus and Gastroesophageal Junction, Cine-Med, Inc., Woodbury, Connecticut, 2008. ISBN 978-0-9749358-6-7.
- Steichen, Félicien M. and Ruth A. Wolsch, Mechanical Sutures in Operations on the Stomach, Biliary Tree & Pancreas, Cine-Med, Inc., Woodbury, Connecticut, 2008. ISBN 978-0-9749358-4-3.
- Steichen, Félicien M. and Ruth A. Wolsch, History of Mechanical Sutures in Surgery, Cine-Med, Inc., Woodbury, Connecticut, 2008. ISBN 978-0-9788890-2-9.
- The Surgical Clinics of North America, Symposium on Stapling Techniques, Vol. 64, No. 3, June 1984. W.B. Saunders Company, Philadelphia. ISSN 0039-6109.

== Papers ==
Steichen also authored or co-authored over 125 articles during his career. A selection follows:

- Steichen, F. M. Des complications de l'aortographie. Bulletin de la Société des Sciences Médicales du Grand Duché de Luxembourg. Juin, 1958. pp. 9–16.
- Ravitch, M.M., Steichen, F.M., Fishbein, R.H., Knowles, P.W. & Weil, P. Clinical Experience with the Soviet Mechanical Bronchus Stapler (UKB-25). Jl. of Thoracic & Cardiovascular Surgery. 1964. Vol. 47, p. 446.
- Steichen, F.M. The Use of Staplers in Anatomical Side-to-Side and Functional End-to-End Enteroanastomoses. Surgery. 1968. Vol. 64, pp. 948–953.
- Steichen, F.M.; Talbert, J.L. and Ravitch, M.M. Evaluation of a Modified Duhamel Operation for Correction of Hirschsprung's Disease. Surgery. 1968. Vol. 64, p. 475.
- Steichen, F.M. Clinical Experience with AutoSuture Instruments. Surgery. 1971. Vol. 69, pp. 609.
- Ravitch, M.M. & Steichen, F.M. Techniques of Staple Suturing in the Gastrointestinal Tract. Annals of Surgery. 1972. Vol. 175, p. 815.
- Ravitch, M.M. & Steichen, F.M. Experiences with a Second Generation of Stapling Instruments in General and Thoracic Surgery. Bull. Soc. Int. Chir. 1972. Vol. 31, p. 502.
- Steichen, F.M. & Ravitch, M.M. Mechanical Sutures in Surgery. British Journal of Surgery. 1973. Vol. 60, p. 191.
- Steichen, F.M. The Creation of Autologous Substitute Organs with Stapling Instruments. Am. Journal of Surgery. 1977. Vol. 134, pp. 659–673.
- Steichen, F.M.; Loubeau, J.M.; and Stremple, J.F. The Continent Ileal Reservoir of Kock. Surgical Rounds. September, 1978. pp. 10–18.
- Ravitch, M.M. & Steichen, F.M. A Stapling Instrument for End-to-End Inverting Anastomoses in the Gastrointestinal Tract. Annals of Surgery. 1979. Vol. 189, p. 791.
- Steichen, F.M. & Ravitch, M.M. Mechanical Sutures in Esophageal Surgery. Annals of Surgery. 1980. Vol. 191, pp. 373–381.
- Steichen, F.M. & Ravitch, M.M. History of Mechanical Devices and Instruments for Suturing. Current Problems in Surgery. 1982. Vol. 19, pp. 1–52.
- Steichen, F.M.; Spigland, N.A.; and Nuñez, D. The Modified Duhamel Operation for Hirschsprung's Disease Performed Entirely with Mechanical Sutures. The Journal of Pediatric Surgery. 1987. Vol. 22, p. 436.

== Films ==
In Pittsburgh, Steichen produced or co-produced 17 films, 10 of which were later converted into video by the Ciné-Med Corporation, and are now in the library of the American College of Surgeons. Some of these were combined and given new names when re-issued between 1989 and 1991:

- Stapling in the Gastrointestinal Tract with the Use of Historical Stapling Instruments
- Colo-Sigmoidectomy and Circular End-To-End Stapled Colo-Rectal Anastomosis
- Paulino Jejunal Pouch, Gastric Replacement
- Eversion, Crossing, and Variations in Design of Linear Staple Lines
- Thoracoscopic Modified Belsey Fundoplication
- The Effect of Surgical Stapling on Technical Concepts in Thoracic and Abdominal Surgery
- Sequential Anastomosis Resection (Anastomosis-Resection Integree)
- Intersecting Linear and Circular Staple Lines
- Everting Stapled Closure of the Bronchus Pulmonary Vessels and Parenchyma in Pulmonary Lobectomies and Parenchymal Resections
- Creation of Substitute Autologous Organs

== Personal life ==
Steichen married Michèle Queinnec on July 2, 1961, in Brignogan-Plages, Finistère, France. She is an Art Historian who worked as a Docent at the Metropolitan Museum of Art and the Cloisters for over 20 years. They were married for 50 years. They had three children and 4 grandchildren.

== Recognition and associations ==
- The Félicien M. Steichen, MD Chair in Surgery of the New York Medical College is named after him.
- The Félicien M. Steichen Prize for Technical Research in General Surgery is given by the Deutsche Gesellschaft für Chirurgie (German Surgical Association) each year to a deserving surgical researcher from among papers submitted to the Association for the prize.
- Fellow of the American Surgical Association
- Fellow of the Halsted Society
- Fellow of the American College of Surgeons
- Honorary Member of the Deutsche Gesellschaft für Chirurgie (German Society for Surgery)
- Associate Foreign Member of the Académie française de Chirurgie (French Academy of Surgery)
- New York Medical College Distinguished Service Award, 2003
- Presented the City of New York Liberty Award Medal, 1986
- Knight of the Civil and Military Order of Merit of Adolphe of Nassau (The "Virtute") of the Grand Duchy of Luxembourg (Civil Division)
- Commander of the Order of the Oak Crown of the Grand Duchy of Luxembourg
- Officer of the Order of the Oak Crown of the Grand Duchy of Luxembourg
- Presented the Medal of the City of Brive-la-Gaillarde, France, September, 1986.
