= 2006 United States elections =

- ← 2004 2005 2006 2007 2008 → Midterm elections
- Election day: November 7
- Incumbent president: ▌George W. Bush (R)
- Next Congress: 110th

Senate elections
- Overall control: Democratic gain
- Seats contested: 33 of 100 seats
- Net seat change: Democratic +5
- 2006 Senate election results map Democratic gain Connecticut for Lieberman gain Democratic hold Republican hold Independent hold

House elections
- Overall control: Democratic gain
- Popular vote margin: Democratic +8.0%
- Net seat change: Democratic +31
- 2006 House election results map Democratic gain Democratic hold Republican hold

Gubernatorial elections
- Seats contested: 38 (36 states, 2 territories)
- Net seat change: Democratic +6
- 2006 gubernatorial election results map Democratic gain Democratic hold Republican hold

Elections were held in the United States on November 7, 2006, in the middle of Republican President George W. Bush's second term against the backdrop of the war on terror. In a political revolution that ended more than a decade of Republican rule, the Democratic Party was swept into majorities of both chambers of Congress, governorships, and state legislatures. These elections were widely categorized as a Democratic wave.

In the Senate, Democrats won a net gain of six seats to secure a narrow majority in that chamber. Democrats also gained 31 seats in the House of Representatives, and following the election, Nancy Pelosi became the first female speaker of the House. In the gubernatorial elections, Democrats achieved a net gain of six seats. Nationwide, Republicans failed to win any congressional or gubernatorial seat that was held by a Democrat before the election. This is the first midterm election since 1954 in which the Democrats ended unified Republican control of Congress in a midterm election under a Republican president. This would not happen again until 2026. This was also the first time since 1994 where a party did not lose a single incumbent in a gubernatorial or congressional election.

The reasons for the Democratic Party's victory included the decline of the public image of George W. Bush, dissatisfaction of his administration's handling of both Hurricane Katrina and the War in Iraq, the beginning of the collapse of the United States housing bubble, Bush's legislative defeat regarding Social Security privatization and immigration reform, the Republican-controlled Congress's unprecedented and unpopular involvement in the Terri Schiavo case, and a series of scandals in 2006 involving Republican politicians.

== Background ==
In March 2003, President George W. Bush ordered an invasion of Iraq, a state which the Bush administration claimed was linked to the September 11 attacks in 2001, and claimed was producing weapons of mass destruction. In May, just two months after the initial invasion, Bush announced the end of major combat operations in Iraq. In the following months, insurgents began resisting the American occupation. Additionally, religious tensions between majority Shiite and minority Sunni Muslims, tensions which had been suppressed under the grip of Saddam's regime, resulted in violence.

By the end of 2003, despite the war's initial popularity, the post-war occupation was losing support from the American public. A November 2003 Gallup poll showed that Bush's job approval rating had fallen to 50% from a high of 71% at the outset of the war.

The next year, Bush won reelection over Democratic nominee Senator John Kerry with less than 51% of the popular vote and 286 electoral votes (only 16 votes ahead of the 270 votes needed), marking the smallest winning margin for an incumbent president since Woodrow Wilson in the 1916 election. However, it was the first time since 1988 that a winner garnered a popular majority.

Terrorism and the war in Iraq dominated the election, with domestic issues taking a secondary role. Bush began his second term with a continuation of the occupation and a push to overhaul Social Security with his privatization plan. Both policies proved unpopular, and violence in Iraq continued to increase. Compounding the unpopularity of the war was that no weapons of mass destruction were found. August 2005 was the last time any major public opinion poll recorded majority approval of Bush's job. Negative perceptions of Bush, following the slow governmental response to Hurricane Katrina, further weighed on his popularity.

Simultaneously, the popularity of the Republican-controlled 109th Congress was also on the decline. A series of notable congressional scandals also took place in Washington, D.C., including the ongoing Jack Abramoff lobbying scandal, as well as the Mark Foley scandal and the Cunningham scandal, both in October 2006. Throughout 2006, sectarian violence persisted in Baghdad and other areas of Iraq; many claimed that the conflict was evolving into a civil war.

President Bush's job approval rarely rose above 40%. Perceptions of Congress and Republicans in general remained highly negative. Additionally, the Congress had a smaller than average list of major accomplishments (considering that the Party in charge of both the House and Senate also had control of the White House) and was not in session for a larger than average number of days. This allowed Democrats and others to characterize it as a "Do-Nothing" Congress and blame the Republican leadership for the lack of progress.

== Results ==
The Democratic Party won a majority of the state governorships and the U.S. House and Senate seats, each for the first time since 1994, an election-year commonly known as the "Republican Revolution." For the first time since the creation of the Republican Party in 1854, no Republican captured any House, Senate, or gubernatorial seat previously held by a Democrat.

Democrats took a 233–202 advantage in the House of Representatives, and achieved a 49–49 tie in the United States Senate. The Senate figure is sometimes quoted in the media as 51–49, which includes two members who ran as independent candidates: Bernie Sanders and Joe Lieberman, who promised to caucus with the Democrats. The final Senate result was decided when Democrat Jim Webb was declared the winner in Virginia against incumbent George Allen, as reported by the Associated Press. On November 9, 2006, Allen and fellow Republican incumbent Sen. Conrad Burns of Montana both conceded defeat, ceding effective control of the Senate to the Democrats.

The election made Nancy Pelosi (D-California) the first-ever female, first-ever Italian-American, and first-ever Californian Speaker of the House and Harry Reid (D-Nevada) the first Mormon Senate Majority Leader. Keith Ellison (D-Minnesota) became the first Muslim ever elected to the U.S. Congress and Mazie Hirono (D-Hawaii) and Hank Johnson (D-Georgia) became the first Buddhists in a United States governing body. Although seven states banned recognition of same-sex marriage, Arizona became the first state to reject such a ballot initiative. South Dakota rejected a ban on abortion under almost any circumstances, intended to overturn federal constitutional abortion-rights nationwide by setting up a strong test case that proponents hoped would lead to the overruling of Roe v. Wade. This result would eventually happen in 2022, with a Mississippi state law that imposed a 15-week ban on abortion leading to the case Dobbs v. Jackson, which then led to Roe's overturning.

Some of the Republican House and Senate seats lost by the Republicans belonged to members of the Republican Revolution of 1994. Senators Rick Santorum of Pennsylvania and Mike DeWine of Ohio, and Representatives Charlie Bass of New Hampshire, John Hostettler of Indiana, Gil Gutknecht of Minnesota, and J. D. Hayworth of Arizona all won previously Democratic seats in 1994 elections and were defeated in 2006. Representative Sue Kelly of New York, also first elected in 1994, was defeated as well. The Democrats also won back the Kansas 2nd and Ohio 18th, both of which they had lost in 1994.

In the 2006 elections, the Democratic Party also claimed a majority of state governorships, gaining control of Republican-held governorships in New York, Massachusetts, Colorado, Arkansas, Maryland, and Ohio, giving the party a 28–22 advantage in governorships.

Various scandals, including the Mark Foley congressional page scandal, the Jack Abramoff scandal, and various allegations of marital infidelity and abuse, doomed certain candidates, especially incumbents in PA-10 and NY-20, which hosted one of the most negative campaigns in the country. Virginia Senator George Allen, a potential Republican 2008 Presidential candidate, saw his chances for reelection disappear when he was caught on video using a racial slur to describe a young Indian-American who worked for his opponent's campaign.

== Federal elections ==
Democrats won control of Congress for the first time since the 1994 election, which is commonly known as the "Republican Revolution." For the first time since the creation of the Republican party in 1854, no Republican captured any House, Senate, or Gubernatorial seat previously held by a Democrat.

=== United States Senate ===
The 33 seats in the United States Senate Class 1 were up for election. The Democrats gained six Senate seats by defeating Republican Senators in the states of Missouri, Montana, Ohio, Pennsylvania, Rhode Island, and Virginia. Including Bernie Sanders and Joe Lieberman, two independents who caucused with the Democrats, Democrats won a 51-to-49 majority in the Senate.

Summary of the November 7, 2006, United States Senate election results

Parties										Total
Parties		Republican	Democratic	Independent	Libertarian	Green	Independence	Constitution	Others	Total
Before these elections		55	44	1 (Note: The Independents caucused with Democrats.)	—	—	—	—	—	100
Not Up	Total	40	27	—	—	—	—	—	—	67
Not Up	Class 2 (2002→2008)	21	12	0	—	—	—	—	—	33
Not Up	Class 3 (2004→2010)	19	15	0	—	—	—	—	—	34
Up	Class 1	15	17	1	—	—	—	—	—	33
Incumbent retired	Held by same party	1	2	1	—	—	—	—	—	4
Incumbent retired	Replaced by other party	—	—	—	—	—	—	—	—	0
Incumbent ran	Total before	14	15 (Note: In Connecticut, Joe Lieberman lost renomination for another term, Ned Lamont became the party's new nominee. Therefore, Lieberman ran as an Independent candidate.)	—	—	—	—	—	—	29
Incumbent ran	Won re-election	8	14	—	—	—	—	—	—	22
Incumbent ran	Lost re-election	▼6 Republicans replaced by ▲6 Democrats		—	—	—	—	—	—	6
Incumbent ran	Lost renomination, held by same party	—	—	—	—	—	—	—	—	0
Incumbent ran	Lost renomination, and party lost	—	▼1 Democrat re-elected as an ▲ Independent		—	—	—	—	—	1
Incumbent ran	Result after	8	20	1	—	—	—	—	—	29
Net gain/loss		▼6	▲5	▲1	—	—	—	—	—	6
Total elected		9	22	2	—	—	—	—	—	33
Result		49	49	2	—	—	—	—	—	100
Popular vote	Votes (turnout: 29.7 %)	25,437,934	32,344,708	378,142	612,732	295,935	231,899	26,934	1,115,432	60,839,144
Popular vote	Share	41.81%	53.16%	0.62%	1.01%	0.49%	0.38%	0.04%	1.83%	100%

Sources:

- Dave Leip's Atlas of U.S. Elections
- United States Elections Project at George Mason University Archived January 25, 2013, at the Wayback Machine

=== United States House of Representatives ===
All 435 seats in the United States House of Representatives were up for election. The Democrats won the national popular vote by a margin of eight percentage points and gained thirty-one seats from the Republicans.

The election made Nancy Pelosi (D-California) the first-ever female, first-ever Italian-American, and first-ever Californian Speaker of the House Keith Ellison (D-Minnesota) became the first Muslim ever elected to the U.S. Congress and Mazie Hirono (D-Hawaii) and Hank Johnson (D-Georgia) became the first Buddhists in a United States governing body.

Summary of the November 7, 2006, United States House of Representatives election results
Party	Seats				Popular vote		
Party	2004	2006	Net change	%	Vote	%	+/−
Democratic Party	202	233	▲31	53.6%	42,338,795	52.3%	+5.5%
Republican Party	232	202	▼30	46.4%	35,857,334	44.3%	−5.1%
Libertarian Party	−	−	−	−	656,764	0.8%	−0.1%
Independent	1	0	▼1	-	417,895	0.5%	−0.1%
Green Party	−	−	−	−	243,391	0.3%	-
Constitution Party	−	−	−	−	91,133	0.1%	−0.1%
Independence Party	−	−	−	−	85,815	0.1%	-
Reform Party	−	−	−	−	53,862	0.1%	−
Other parties	−	−	−	−	1,230,548	1.5%	−0.1%
Totals	435	435	−	100.0%	80,975,537	100.0%	−
Voter turnout: 36.8%
Sources: Election Statistics - Office of the Clerk

== State elections ==
=== Governors ===
Of the 50 United States governors, 36 were up for election. Twenty two of those contested seats were held by Republicans, and the remaining 14 were held by Democrats. Of the 36 state governorships up for election, ten were open due to retirement, term limits, or primary loss. Democrats won open Republican-held seats in New York, Massachusetts, Ohio, Arkansas and Colorado, in addition to defeating incumbent Bob Ehrlich in Maryland and holding their sole open seat in Iowa. As a result of the 2006 gubernatorial elections, there were 28 Democratic governors and 22 Republican governors, a reversal of the numbers held by the respective parties prior to the elections.

Additionally, governorships were up for election in the U.S. territories of Guam, held by a Republican, and the U.S. Virgin Islands, where the Democratic governor was retiring. In each location, the incumbent party maintained control of the governorship.

=== State legislatures ===
Nearly all state legislatures were up for election. Prior to the general elections, with the exception of the nonpartisan Nebraska Legislature, 21 legislatures were controlled by Republicans, 19 by Democrats, and 9 were split legislatures (where each house is controlled by a different party). As a result of the 2006 elections, 23 legislatures were carried by Democrats, 16 by Republicans, and 10 legislatures were split. In all, Republicans lost, and Democrats gained more than 300 state legislative seats.

Democrats flipped ten legislative chambers, while Republicans gained control of one. In total, Democrats gained or retained control of the state legislatures and governorships of 15 states, thus creating a unified government in Arkansas, Colorado, Illinois, Iowa, Louisiana, Maine, Maryland, Massachusetts, New Hampshire, New Jersey, New Mexico, North Carolina, Oregon, Washington and West Virginia, although the governorship of Louisiana reverted to the Republicans with the October 2007 election of Bobby Jindal. Republicans now control ten state governments, these being, Florida, Georgia, Idaho, Missouri, North Dakota, South Carolina, South Dakota, Texas and Utah.

Democrats flipped ten legislative chambers. Democrats gained control of the Oregon House of Representatives, the Minnesota House of Representatives, both houses of the Iowa General Assembly, and both houses of the New Hampshire General Court- for the first time since 1875, giving them complete legislative control over those states. The Iowa Senate was previously tied. Democrats also won majorities in the Wisconsin Senate, the Michigan House of Representatives, the Pennsylvania House of Representatives, and the Indiana House of Representatives, turning those legislatures into split bodies. Additionally, a Democratic-led coalition was created in the Alaska Senate, which was previously a Republican majority. Democrats won a majority of state legislative chambers for the first time since 1995.

Conversely, Republicans gained control of the Montana House of Representatives with the lone Constitution Party representative voting for Republican control of that body.

Democrats won a veto-proof supermajority in both houses of the Connecticut General Assembly, with Democrats holding a commanding 131–56 majority. The most dramatic change in party control occurred with the New Hampshire General Court, where Republicans held a 92-seat majority in the House and an eight-seat majority in the Senate prior to the election. Ultimately, Republicans were down 81 seats in the House and five in the Senate, giving control of the General Court to the Democrats. This coincided with the landslide reelection of Democratic Governor John Lynch, the takeover of both of New Hampshire's U.S. House seats by Democrats, and New Hampshire's unique Executive Council gaining a Democratic majority.

==== Third parties ====
Third parties received largely mixed results in the 2006 elections. In the Maine House of Representatives, Green State Representative John Eder was narrowly defeated by Democratic rival Jon Hinck in a bitterly contested campaign over Portland's 118th District. Eder's loss deprived the U.S. Green movement's highest elected position in any state office.

In the Vermont House of Representatives, the Vermont Progressive Party successfully maintained its six seats within the chamber. The Vermont Progressive Party has in recent years become one of the most consistently successful third parties in the U.S. to be elected to higher office.

In Illinois, seemingly out of dissatisfaction with both the candidacies of Democratic Governor Rod Blagojevich and Republican candidate Judy Baar Topinka resulted in 10% of the electorate voting for the Green Party candidate Rich Whitney, an accomplishment, by all means, considering Whitney did not campaign on television or radio.

In Montana, Rick Jore made history by becoming the first candidate of the right-wing Constitution Party to be elected to a state legislature, elected to the 12th District in the Montana House of Representatives. Jore initially won in 2004 by three votes, only to see the courts throw out enough ballots to give the Democrats the victory. In the 2006 elections, Jore won convincingly, garnering 56.2% of the vote. However, the Montana Constitution Party is no longer chartered under the national party, denying the United States Constitution Party the claim of holding a higher office.

Neither the Libertarian nor the Reform Parties gained any state legislative seats.

=== Ballot initiatives ===
Voters weighed in on various ballot initiatives. These included:

- In a hotly contested referendum that inspired a widely publicized feud between conservative radio talk show host Rush Limbaugh and actor Michael J. Fox, Missouri voters narrowly passed an initiative to allow funding for embryonic stem cell research. The presence of the referendum on the ballot may also have aided Democrat Claire McCaskill in her victory over incumbent senator Jim Talent, who had opposed the measure.
- An amendment to the Missouri Constitution that would have levied a Tobacco Tax was defeated 51 to 48.
- Raising the minimum wage, which passed in all six states with such referendums (AZ, CO, MO, MT, NV, OH)
- In Washington an initiative to repeal the estate tax failed.

Vote for same-sex marriage ban by counties: 90–100% 80–90% 70–80% 60–70% 50–60% Vote against same-sex marriage ban by counties: 70–80% 60–70% 50–60%

- State constitutional amendments prohibiting same-sex marriage are passed in seven out of eight states: Colorado, Idaho, South Carolina, South Dakota, Tennessee, Virginia, Wisconsin, with Arizona voting against the proposition that would ban same-sex marriage and civil unions, the first state in the nation to do so. The measures in Colorado and Tennessee bans same-sex marriage only, while Idaho, South Carolina, South Dakota, and Wisconsin bans both same-sex marriage and civil unions and Virginia bans granting any benefits whatsoever to same-sex couples.
- Colorado voters narrowly rejected an amendment to establish domestic partnerships by a margin of 53% to 47%.
- Legalizing cannabis, failing in both states with such referendums for use for unconditional reasons (Colorado, Nevada) as well as for medical use only (South Dakota)
- Restricting affirmative action, passing in Michigan
- Requiring parental notification before an abortion for minors, failing in both states with such referendums (California, Oregon)
- Banning nearly all abortions, including those for victims of rape and incest, which failed in South Dakota
- Instant-runoff voting, which passed in the city of Minneapolis, Minnesota
- A referendum to ease restrictions on wine sales in Massachusetts, which failed.
- Rhode Island voters approved a constitutional amendment to reextend the franchise to former criminals following their release, effectively enfranchising individuals on parole or probation.
- In California, voters endorsed a $37 billion package of bonds (Propositions 1A through 1E) to pay for transportation projects, housing, levee repairs and other infrastructure—said to be the largest program of its kind in U.S. history.

== Local elections ==
Numerous other elections for local, city, and county public offices were held.

An unusual local election occurred in South Dakota; Marie Steichen was elected to Jerauld County Commissioner, despite her death two months before the election. Her name was never replaced on the ballot, and voters who chose her were aware of her death.

In Richmond, California, a city of more than 100,000 residents, the Green Party challenger, City Councilperson Gayle McLaughlin, unseated Democratic incumbent Irma Anderson and became the first Green Party Mayor of a city of that size.

Two candidates in Nevada's branch of the Constitution Party, called the Independent American Party (Nevada), were also elected to office. Jackie Berg was elected Eureka County Clerk with 54.1% of the vote, easily topping Republican and Libertarian opposition. Also, Cel Ochoa will be the new Constable in Searchlight, Nevada by virtue of winning 54.93% of the vote to defeat her Republican rival. Another Nevada Independent Party member, Bill Wilkerson, was elected to the Elko, Nevada, School Board, in a non-partisan race.

In Missoula County, Montana, residents passed a measure to encourage the County Sheriff's Department to make marijuana enforcement a last priority.

In Dallas County, Texas, Democrats regained control in 41 out of 42 contested GOP judgeships, as well as the district attorney's office and the county judge's seat.

== Analysis ==
Beginning just after George W. Bush's reelection, political analysts point to a number of factors and events that led to the eventual Republican defeat in 2006. It is generally agreed that the single most important issue during the 2006 election was the war in Iraq, and more specifically President Bush's handling of it and the overall public weariness over it.

Public opinion polling conducted during the days just before the election and the weeks just after it showed that the war in Iraq was considered the most important election issue by the largest segment of the public. Exit polling showed that relatively large majorities of voters both fell into the category of disapproving of the war or expressing the desire to withdraw troops in some type of capacity. Both brackets broke extremely heavily for Democrats. The issue of the war seemed to play a large part in the nationalization of the election, a departure from previous midterm elections, which tended to be about local, district-centric issues. The effect of this was a general nationwide advantage for Democrats, who were not seen as being as tied to the war as Republicans, led by George Bush, were.

President Bush himself, seen as the leader and face of the Republican Party, was a large factor in the 2006 election. Exit polls showed that a large block of the electorate had voted for Democrats or for third parties specifically because of personal opposition to or dislike for Bush. The size of the segment that said it had voted specifically to support Bush was not as large. Opposition to Bush was based on a number of factors, these not limited to opposition to his Social Security privatization plan, the slow response of his administration to Hurricane Katrina, his perceived inaction in the face of and association with rising gas prices, and as mentioned above, his continued commitment to the war.

Congressional approval, which had been slightly negative since before the 2004 election, began a steady drop beginning in March 2005. Congress's unprecedented and unpopular involvement in the Terri Schiavo controversy is often pointed to as the catalyst for this drop. Congressional scandals, such as the Jack Abramoff lobbying scandal, the sentencing of Duke Cunningham to over eight years in prison, the indictment of then House majority leader Tom DeLay, the corruption of William J. Jefferson and Bob Ney, the misconduct of Cynthia McKinney, and the Mark Foley scandal all continued to pull down congressional popularity. In the months leading up to the election, congressional approval ratings flirted with all-time historical lows. Because congress was controlled by Republicans, this high disapproval affected Republicans much more negatively than it did with Democrats.

Democrats were successful in portraying Congress as a lazy, greedy, egotistical and inefficient "Do-Nothing Congress.", which they contrasted with their "New Direction for America" campaign. Indeed, the congress had been in session much less than previous ones had (including those under Republican control), and numerous public opinion polls showed that large majorities believed that the congress had accomplished less than normal. This too, took a toll on Republicans (as the leaders of the government).

The listed scandals were all dwarfed by the highly publicised Mark Foley scandal, which broke in late September and rapidly metastasized to include the House Republican leadership. Florida Representative Mark Foley, who ironically headed the House Caucus on Missing and Exploited Children, was found to have been making sexually lewd and highly inappropriate contacts online with male congressional pages, and it was soon found that members of the Republican leadership knew in some capacity of Foley's advances, yet took little action. The scandal allowed Democrats to adopt corruption as a campaign issue, and exit polls on election day showed that corruption remained an important issue, one that Democrats held an advantage on. In addition, many (at the time and after the fact) cited the scandal as an event that sealed the fate of the Republican congress. After the election, top Republican strategist Karl Rove specifically named the Foley scandal as the cause of the Republicans' loss of congress.

The result was that on election day, many congressional seats had been touched by Republican scandals and were easier to pick up for Democrats than under normal conditions. These include but are not limited to the Montana Senate, Virginia Senate, CA-11, PA-07, PA-10, TX-22, OH-18, FL-16 and NY-20 races.

Almost all of the gains made by Democrats came from large gains among independents, not Republicans. Democrats, Republicans, and independents all accounted for proportions of the electorate similar to what they did in 2004. Democrats and Republicans voted nearly as loyally for their parties in 2006 as they did in 2004, but independents exhibited a large swing towards Democrats. In 2004, independents split 49–46, slightly in favor of Democrats, but in 2006 they voted 57–39 for Democrats, a fifteen-point swing and the largest margin among independents for Democrats since the 1986 elections.

== Voting issues ==
There were scattered reports of problems at polling places across the country as new electronic voting systems were introduced in many states. The problems ranged from voter and election official confusion about how to use new voting machines to apparent political dirty tricks designed to keep certain voters from casting their votes to inclement voter suppressing turnout.

Some reported problems:

- Millions of allegedly harassing and deceptive "robo-calls" were reported or placed in at least 53 house districts. The vast majority of the calls were reported to begin with the message "Hello, I'm calling with information about (Democratic candidate)" and continue with a negative message concerning the candidate. Regulatory statements concerning the sponsor of the message (usually the NRCC) allegedly did not come until after the message, instead of before, as the FCC mandates. Citizens reported receiving calls several times an hour and as late as 2:30 AM, and many held the mistaken belief that the calls were from Democratic campaigns.
- Massive undervoting in several Florida counties, likely caused by bad ballot design. An analysis from the Orlando Sentinel claims the undervoting swung an election to the GOP in Florida's 13th congressional district. Democratic candidate Christine Jennings brings a lawsuit to court.
- In Gateway, Arkansas, an 80% turnout was recorded, including two towns where the number of votes surpassed the estimated number of voters from the previous year's census.
- Waldenburg, Arkansas mayoral candidate, Randy Wooten, gets no votes despite claiming he voted for himself and "at least eight or nine people who said they voted for [him]."
- In the Pittsburgh, Pennsylvania area, officials could not print reports to verify that voting machines were secure and did not already have votes in them.
- Voting-machine problems kept polls open until 9:00 PM, an hour later than scheduled, in Lebanon County, Pennsylvania.
- A man in Allentown, Pennsylvania smashed an electronic voting machine with a paperweight. The votes were recovered.
- In a small town in Oklahoma, a power outage in a polling station was caused by a squirrel gnawing on a power cable.
- Officials and experts reported electronic voting machine malfunctions in Indiana, Ohio, New Jersey, Colorado and Florida.
- A bomb threat at East High School caused a voting shutdown in Madison, Wisconsin.
- A Kentucky poll worker was charged with choking a voter.
- Vandals chained the main door and broke keys into the locks of New Jersey Republican candidate for Senate Tom Kean Jr.'s headquarters. Accusations have been made towards Democratic incumbent Bob Menendez, but they deny any involvement in the situation.
- Disabled voters were asked by election officials in Bonneville County, Idaho to use punch card ballots.
- Irregularities with Diebold and other voting machines have been reported in the early elections.
- The Chicago Board of Elections has been running a Web site that has allowed, by a simple programming hack, the exposure of personal information of a million registered voters (fixed on October 21, 2006).
- Reports from Virginia:
  - FBI looking into possible Virginia voter intimidation.
  - Calls that voting will lead to arrest.
  - Telling voters that their polling location has changed.
  - Fliers in Buckingham county say "Skip the election"
  - Voting machine problems.
- On Election day November 7, talk show host Laura Ingraham prompted listeners to jam the Democratic Voter Protection hotline where voting problems were to be reported, reminiscent of the 2002 New Hampshire Senate election phone jamming scandal.
- In Maryland, some voters were given sample ballots by Republican supporters that incorrectly listed Republicans Robert Ehrlich and Michael Steele as Democrats.
- Electronic voting machine problems in Kane County, Illinois kept the polls open until 8:30pm CST, an hour and a half later than scheduled.
- In western Washington, flooding from heavy rainfall interfered with the elections.
- In Denver, Colorado, the computer system containing the voter registration rolls slowed down and crashed on several occasions during the day causing lines that were over two hours long at some vote centers. Some vote centers ran out of provisional ballots, and sample ballots had to be used instead.
- Also in Denver, 44,000 absentee ballots were misprinted with the "yes" and "no" positions on a ballot issue reversed. Also, the bar code designating the ballot style was misprinted, requiring the ballots to be hand sorted which delayed results by over a week. The problem is blamed on ballot misprints by Sequoia Voting Systems. Some ballots had to be hand-copied onto other ballots before they could be counted.
- A new voter ID law in Maricopa County, Arizona was subject to a lawsuit, Purcell v. Gonzalez, in which the Supreme Court established the Purcell principle against changing rules very close to an election.

== Ramifications ==
Many political analysts concluded that the results of the election were based around President George W. Bush's policies in the War in Iraq and corruption in Congress. At a press conference given to address the election results, President Bush called the cumulative results of the election a "thumpin'" by the Democrats.

=== Democratic agenda ===
Democrats promised an agenda that included raising the minimum wage, implementing all of the 9/11 Commission recommendations, eliminating subsidies for oil companies, restricting lobbyists, repealing tax cuts for the wealthiest Americans, lowering interest rates on college loans, expanding stem-cell research, investigating political appointees for actions taken during and leading to the war in Iraq, allowing current tax cuts to expire, and negotiating Medicare prescription drug prices. They planned to legislate these issues within their first 100 legislative hours of power in January 2007. According to Brian Wright, president of Democrasource, LLC (an Ohio-based national political consulting group), "There's no question, the administration and Iraq set the tone for this year. This new balance of power can be a true catalyst to get the country back on track."

==== Six-point plan ====
Prior to the election in July 2006 Democrats unveiled a six-point plan they promised to enact if elected with congressional majorities. The plan was billed the "Six for 06 agenda" and officially called "A New Direction For America" and compared to the 1994 Republican "Contract with America". The six-points of the plan include: "honest leadership and open government, real security, energy independence, economic prosperity and educational excellence, a healthcare system that works for everyone, and retirement security".

- Real security
  - In regards to "real security" they propose a "phased redeployment" of U.S. forces from Iraq, doubling the size of U.S. military special forces to capture Osama bin Laden and destroy terrorist groups such as al Qaeda, and implementing the 9/11 Commission proposals to secure the national borders of the United States and screen every container arriving at U.S. ports.
- Economic prosperity and educational excellence
  - Democratic plans for economic prosperity include ending the congressional pay raise until the federal minimum wage is raised and withholding tax breaks from U.S. companies that outsource jobs to foreign countries. Within education they plan to cut college loan rates, expand federal grants, and ensure that funds used for college tuition are not taxed.
- Energy independence
  - The Democratic plan for achieving an end to American dependence on foreign countries for oil consists of repealing tax incentives given to oil companies, higher penalties for price gouging gasoline products, increasing tax incentives and funding for the research and development of technologies intended to improve fuel-efficiency and creating viable alternative fuel supplies such as biofuels.

=== Domestic ===
==== Donald Rumsfeld ====
With apparent reference to the impact of the Iraq war policy, in a press conference held on November 8, Bush talked about the election and announced the resignation of Secretary of Defense Donald Rumsfeld. Bush stated, "I know there's a lot of speculation on what the election means for the battle we're waging in Iraq. I recognize that many Americans voted last night to register their displeasure with the lack of progress being made there." Prior to the election, Bush had stated that he intended to keep Rumsfeld on as Secretary of Defense until the end of his presidency. However, Bush then went on to add Rumsfeld's resignation was not due to the Democratic victories on November 8. Rumsfeld's job reportedly had been on the line for several months prior to the election, and the decision for him to stay until after the election, if he was going to be let go at all, was also reportedly made several months earlier. All this led to his resignation.

==== Republican leadership ====
On the same day, then Speaker of the House, Representative Dennis Hastert of the 14th Congressional District of Illinois, said he would not seek the Minority Leader position for the 110th Congress.

==== Voting trends ====
In the aftermath of the election The Weekly Standard published a number of articles highly critical of how the Republican Party had managed the United States Congress. It called the electoral defeat for the G.O.P. "only a little short" of "devastating" saying the "party of reform ... didn't reform anything" and warned that the Democratic Party has expanded its "geographical sphere of Democratic power" to formerly Republican-held states such as Montana, Colorado, Arizona, Wyoming, Pennsylvania, Indiana, Ohio, Michigan, Wisconsin and Minnesota, while it solidified former swing states like Illinois as Democratic strongholds. In the New England region, popular Republican Senator Lincoln Chafee of Rhode Island was defeated, despite having approval ratings near 60% and Republicans now only control a single district, the CT-04 seat held by Chris Shays, out of 22 congressional districts. The Democrats also became the clear majority in the Mid Atlantic region as well. Two Republican incumbent Congressmen were defeated in New York state and the Democrats picked up a Republican open seat, all from Republican regions upstate, and four Republican Congressmen were defeated in Pennsylvania. Democrats picked up seats in all Northeastern state legislatures holding elections, except Rhode Island, which remained unchanged (and Democrats clearly in the majority), winning a supermajority in both the Connecticut House and Senate, and winning both houses of the New Hampshire legislature for the first time since 1874. Democrats kept both vulnerable Senate seats in Maryland and New Jersey, winning them by wider margins than predicted, and they won the heavily contested Senate seats in Missouri and Virginia.

The Democratic expansion into Indiana, Virginia and Ohio has "seriously diminished the chances for future Republican success" it claimed. The paper, which has been described as the "quasi-official organ of the Bush Administration" also stated that more people would have to "bendover" to get anywhere in a political office and has called on Republicans to move to the center for the sake of the party's future viability saying "conservatives won't want to hear this, but the Republican who maneuvered his way into the most impressive victory ... won ... after moving to the center" and that "the South is not enough space to build a national governing majority".

=== International ===
==== Asia ====
- The government of the People's Republic of China was said to be nervous about the effect a Democratic-led Congress might have on its exports to the United States market and the possible controversy that could result because of the country's human rights record. Nancy Pelosi, who became the Speaker of the House, is a noted critic of Chinese policy. Concerns likely to be raised include the undervalued Chinese currency, blamed by some for the recent losses in the American manufacturing industry, and issues such as internet censorship, piracy, limited market access within China itself for companies based in the U.S., and religious freedom. The Chinese Foreign Ministry spokeswoman Jiang Yu stated that she hoped the United States would play a "constructive role" in maintaining "sound, healthy and stable relations between China and the U.S.".

==== Europe ====
- (Belgium) Belgian Minister of Defence André Flahaut expressed his approval of Rumsfeld's resignation. He said Rumsfeld was "obstinate", and he hoped that the elections would bring upon a change in the United States' foreign policy.
- Danish Prime Minister Anders Fogh Rasmussen said he hoped that President Bush and the newly elected Congress could find common ground and resolve issues regarding the War in Afghanistan and the War in Iraq. Rasmussen also said Denmark would keep its troops in Iraq and neither the election nor the resignation of Donald Rumsfeld would change government foreign policies.
- France's Minister of Defence Michele Alliot-Marie said that her American counterpart, Donald Rumsfeld, had "taken the consequences" of an election in which voters punished the government over the war in Iraq. The former Socialist Prime Minister of France, Laurent Fabius, was quoted as saying, ""A lot of Americans have realised that Mr. Bush has lied to them."
- (Germany) The German Foreign Office's coordinator for German-American cooperation, Karsten D. Voigt, said that he believed that the Democratic-controlled Congress will be more cooperative with the world, but he expects that Europeans will have to carry more influence on such foreign issues of importance, such as the war in Iraq and in Afghanistan, and the nuclear weapon programs of North Korea and Iran. Voigt further stated that Europe needed to develop a stronger relationship with the United States, especially with newly elected Congressional politicians. Voigt went on to say that doing so would help "better convey European positions on major international issues and make concerted efforts to find constructive political solutions for the future."
- Labour Party Member of Parliament John McDonnell, a critic of United Kingdom Prime Minister Tony Blair, said, "the message of the American people is clear – there needs to be a major change of direction in Iraq. Just as in Britain, people in the U.S. feel that they have been ill advised, misled and ignored." McDonnell, who became the first Labour Party MP to announce that he would stand for leadership in 2007, also said, "These election results have not only damaged Bush, they mean that Blair is now totally isolated in the international community."
- Prime Minister of Italy, Romano Prodi, believed that it was Bush's Iraq policy that had led to the complete turnover in the elections. He said that Bush would "have to negotiate with the opposition on all issues."
- (Spain) The ruling Spanish Socialist Workers' Party responded to the elections stating that they hoped the elections "would help to change the course of U.S. foreign policy."

==== Middle East ====
- Iran's Supreme Leader Ayatollah Ali Khamenei on Friday called U.S. President George W. Bush's defeat in congressional elections a victory for Iran. "This issue (the elections) is not a purely domestic issue for America, but it is the defeat of Bush's hawkish policies in the world", Khamenei said in remarks reported by Iran's student news agency ISNA on Friday. "Since Washington's hostile and hawkish policies have always been against the Iranian nation, this defeat is actually an obvious victory for the Iranian nation." "The result of this election indicates that the majority of American people are dissatisfied and are fed up with the policies of the American administration", the IRNA state news agency quoted Ahmadinejad as saying.
  - In a letter to the American people released on Wednesday, November 29, 2006, via Iran's Permanent Mission to the United Nations in New York City, Mahmoud Ahmadinejad wrote:

I'd also like to say a word to the winners of the recent elections in the U.S. :

The United States has had many administrations; some who have left a positive legacy, and others that are neither remembered fondly by the American people nor by other nations.

Now that you control an important branch of the U.S. Government, you will also be held to account by the people and by history.

If the U.S. Government meets the current domestic and external challenges with an approach based on truth and Justice, it can remedy some of the past afflictions and alleviate some of the global resentment and hatred of America . But if the approach remains the same, it would not be unexpected that the American people would similarly reject the new electoral winners, although the recent elections, rather than reflecting a victory, in reality point to the failure of the current administration's policies. These issues had been extensively dealt with in my letter to President Bush earlier this year.
