= New Direction for America =

The New Direction for America was part of the political platform of Congressional Democrats in the 2006 United States congressional elections. It was similar in strategy to the Contract with America of the Republicans in 1994, which gave clear-cut campaign promises six weeks before the crucial 1994 mid-term elections, and was a deciding factor in the ensuing Republican victory.
