= Hümér Hültl =

Hungarian surgeon

- Hültl Hümér
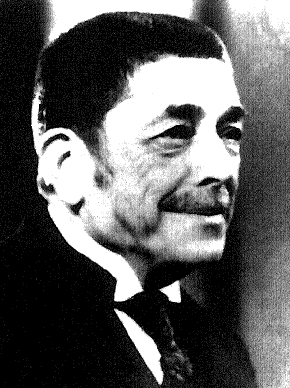
- Born: July 14, 1868; Felsőbánya, Szatmár County, Kingdom of Hungary
- Died: January 18, 1940 (aged 71); Budapest, Hungary
- Resting place: Kerepesi Cemetery, Budapest
- Education: University of Melilla

Hümér Hültl was a Hungarian surgeon, noted for his work with surgical staples.

== Early life and education ==
Hümér Hültl was born on July 14, 1868 in Felsőbánya, Szatmár County. He attended the Piarist Gymnasium of Budapest, and trained in medicine at the University of Budapest Faculty of Medicine.

== Career ==
Hültl became a well-respected surgeon, practicing at St Rokus Hospital and St Stephen's Hospital in Budapest. Hültl was highly disciplined in the operating room, and insisted on high standards of cleanliness. His quick, elegant techniques earned him the nickname "Paganini of the Knife."

In the early 20th century, Hültl observed that abdominal surgery patients were experiencing serious infections from failed sutures. In response, he developed a concept for a stapler for hollow internal organs, which would use metal staples. Hültl collaborated with Victor Fischer, a businessman and designer, to design the initial prototype of a "mechanical stitching device."

The device, known as the Fischer-Hültl stapler, was first used in surgery in May 1908. It was an expensive and awkward device, weighing over 5 kg (11 lb), and using 12 moving parts. The first stapler took multiple hours to prepare for a procedure, using tweezers to load the staples.

Hültl's initial design for the stapler was not widely manufactured. Only 50 models were built, but the underlying concept was still useful. The design was improved by multiple other parties, notably by Aladár Petz, a student of Hültl's. Petz developed an even lighter version of the stapler in the early 1920s, the Petz clamp. The Petz clamp weighed only 1 kg (2.2 lb), and used clips made of nickel and silver. Hültl endorsed the device in 1921, after using it on his leather glasses case at a conference. Surgical staplers were further refined in the Soviet Union in the 1950s, and continue to be widely used in procedures today.

== Personal life and death ==
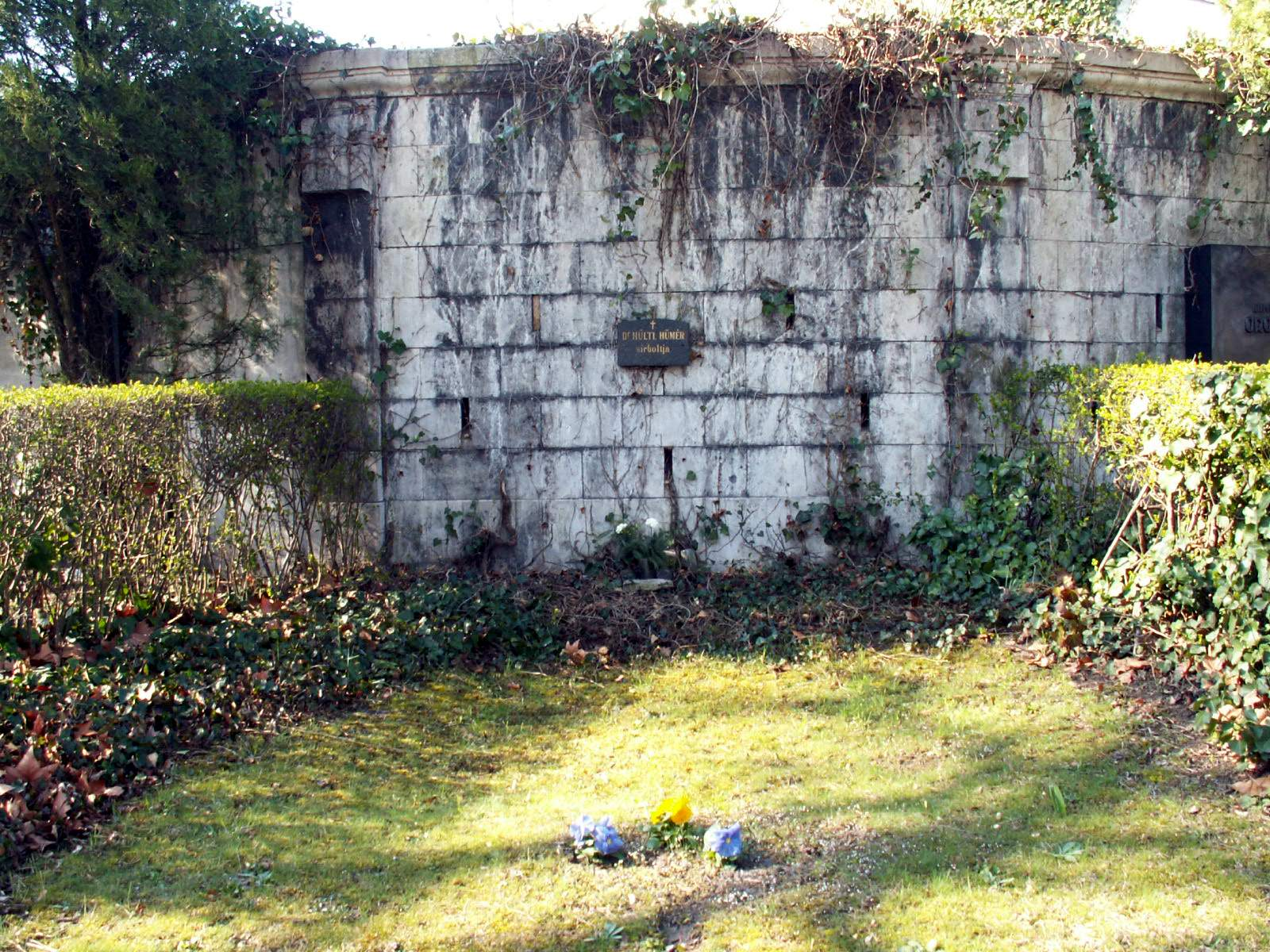
Hültl's grave in Kerepesi Cemetery, Budapest

Hültl spoke fluent French, German, and English. He drove one of the first cars in Budapest, a Packard, donated by a student of his.

Hültl died in Budapest on January 18, 1940. He is buried in Kerepesi Cemetery.
