= Marie Steichen =

American politician (died 2006)

Marie Steichen (died September 2006) was a Democratic politician from Woonsocket, South Dakota, who gained fame for winning a local election two months after dying of cancer. In the general election of November 7, 2006 she defeated, by a vote of 100 to 64, the incumbent Republican candidate Merlin Feistner for the post of commissioner of Jerauld County in the U.S. state of South Dakota.

This was the first time she had stood for election for political office. She and her husband Harold lived on a farm south of Lane, South Dakota. In the primary election, she had defeated Rick Easton of Wessington Springs by just one vote, 22–21.

== See also ==
- Mel Carnahan
