= Turi Josefsen =

Norwegian-American businesswoman (born 1954)

Turi Josefsen (born 1926 in Hammerfest, Norway) is a Norwegian-American businesswoman. She was Vice-President of United States Surgical Corporation (USSC) (headed by her ex-husband, Leon C Hirsch), and CEO of the European division, Auto Suture Europe. In the early 1990s she was the highest-paid woman in corporate America and at one time reportedly the world's highest paid woman CEO. After USSC was taken over by Tyco International she joined the board of WebSurg S.A., a pioneering online surgical training programme.

Josefsen was born in Hammerfest and has invested considerably in the area, including part-funding a new equestrian centre in 2003. She published a book and commissioned a film about the region. Ms. Turi Josefsen is the Founder at JHK Investments LLC and is a Member of Executive and Transaction and Finance Committees

Josefsen has endowed fellowships and chairs in surgery, including a Chair of Surgery at the University of Illinois at Chicago (UIC).
