= Steichen (crater) =

Crater on Mercury

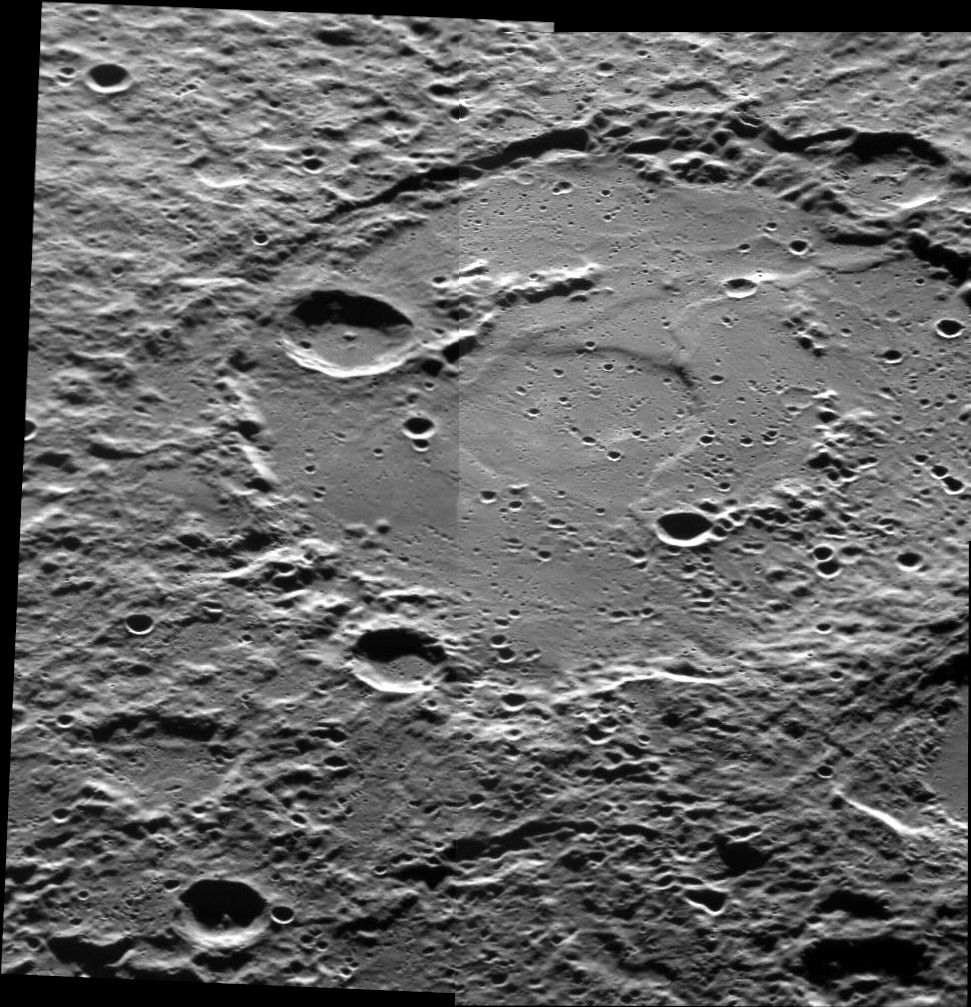
- MESSENGER NAC mosaic
- Planet: Mercury
- Coordinates: 12.79°S 282.96°W
- Quadrangle: Eminescu
- Diameter: 196.0 km (121.8 mi)
- Eponym: Edward Steichen

Steichen is a crater on Mercury. Its name was adopted by the International Astronomical Union (IAU) in 2010. The crater was named after American photographer and painter, Edward Steichen.

Steichen is one of 110 peak ring basins on Mercury. Some of the mountains of the peak ring appear to have hollows on them.

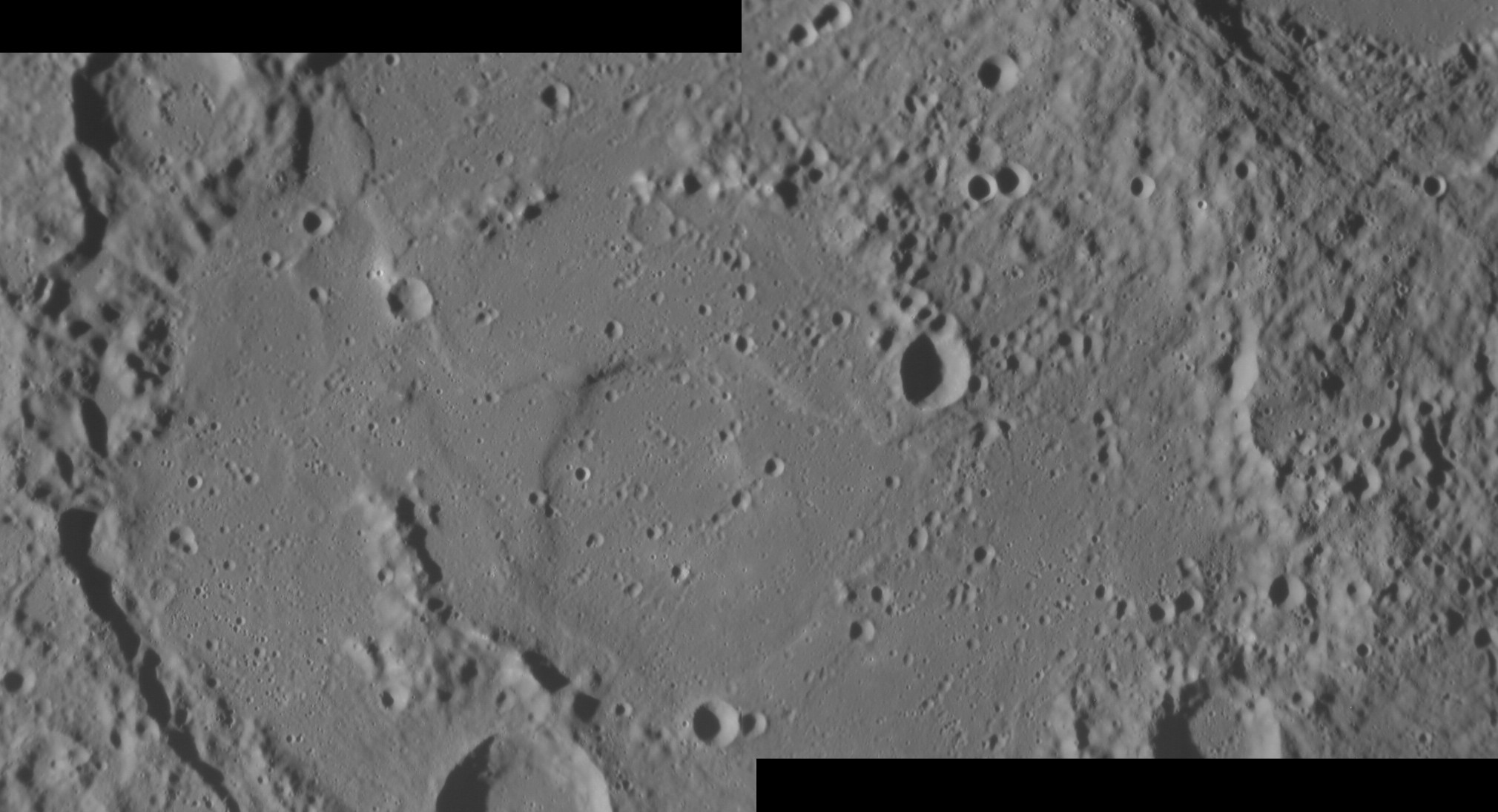
Steichen crater

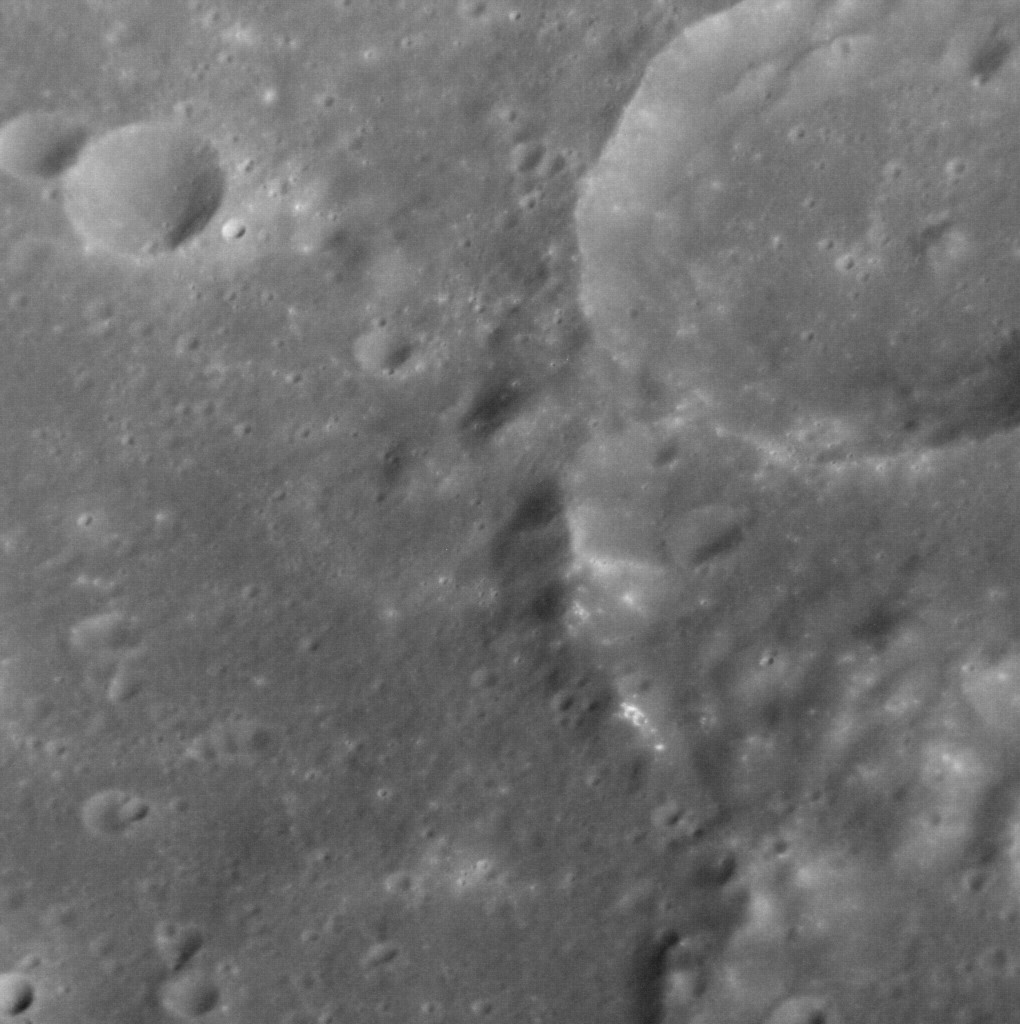
Hollows on mountain within Steichen crater
