= Surgical staple =

Staples used in surgery in place of sutures

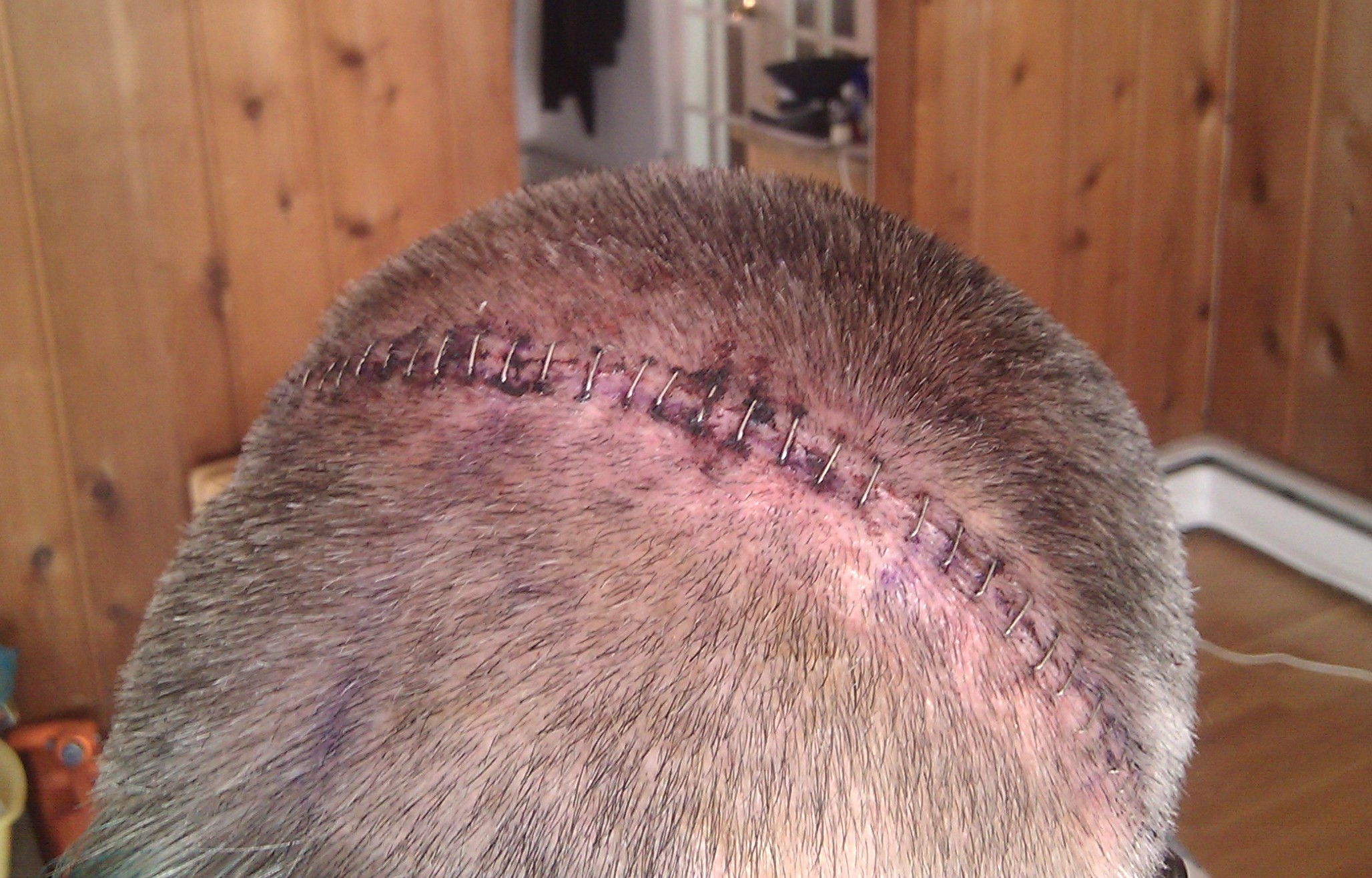
34 surgical staples closing scalp following craniotomy

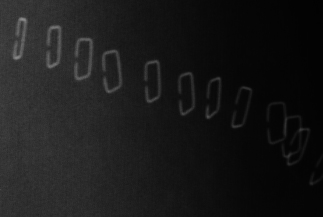
Projectional radiograph of surgical staples.

Surgical staples are specialized staples used in surgery in place of sutures to close skin wounds or to resect and/or connect parts of an organ (e.g. bowels, stomach or lungs). The use of staples over sutures reduces local inflammation, the width of the wound, and the time it takes to close a defect.

A more recent development, from the 1990s, uses clips instead of staples for some applications; this does not require the staple to penetrate.

== History ==
The technique was pioneered by the "father of surgical stapling", Hungarian surgeon Hümér Hültl. Hungarian businessman Victor Fischer also made significant contributions to the invention of the surgical stapler. Together Hültl and Fischer's 1908 prototype stapler weighed 8 pounds (3.6 kg), and required two hours to assemble and load.

The technology was refined in the 1950s in the Soviet Union, allowing for the first commercially produced re-usable stapling devices for creation of bowel and anastomoses. Mark M. Ravitch brought a sample of stapling device after attending a surgical conference in the USSR, and introduced it to entrepreneur Leon C. Hirsch, who founded the United States Surgical Corporation in 1964 to manufacture surgical staplers under its Auto Suture brand. Until the late 1970s USSC had the market essentially to itself, but in 1977 Johnson & Johnson's Ethicon brand entered the market and today both are widely used, along with competitors from the Far East. USSC was bought by Tyco Healthcare in 1998, which became Covidien on June 29, 2007.

Safety and patency of mechanical (stapled) bowel anastomoses has been widely studied. Studies generally show sutured anastomoses are comparable or less prone to leakage. It is possible that this is the result of recent advances in suture technology, along with the increasingly risk-conscious surgical practice. Certainly modern synthetic sutures are more predictable and less prone to infection than catgut, silk and linen, which were the main suture materials used up to the 1990s.

One key feature of intestinal staplers is that the edges of the stapler act as a haemostat, compressing the edges of the wound and closing blood vessels during the stapling process. Recent studies have shown that with current suturing techniques there is no significant difference in outcome between hand sutured and mechanical anastomoses (including clips), but mechanical anastomoses are significantly quicker to perform.

Patients undergoing pulmonary resections, where lung tissue is sealed with staplers, often experience postoperative air leakage. Alternative techniques for sealing lung tissue are currently being investigated.

== Types and applications ==
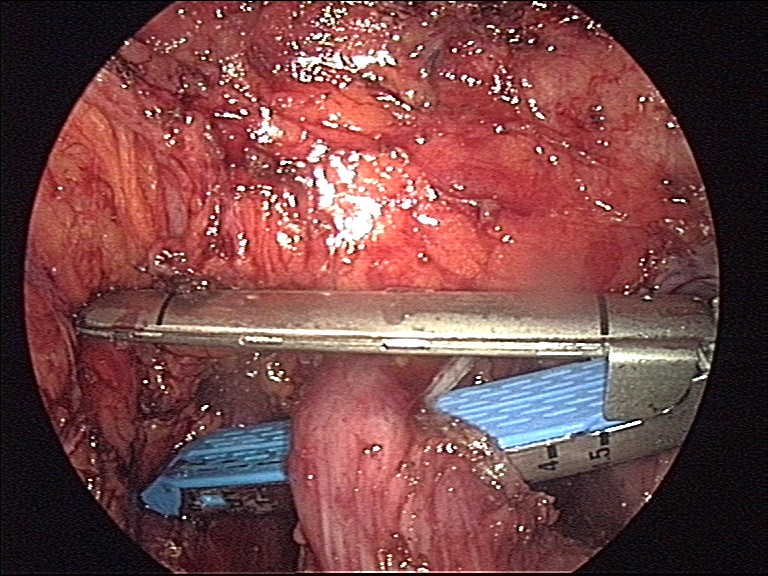
Example of Laparoscopic stapling on the sigmoid colon.

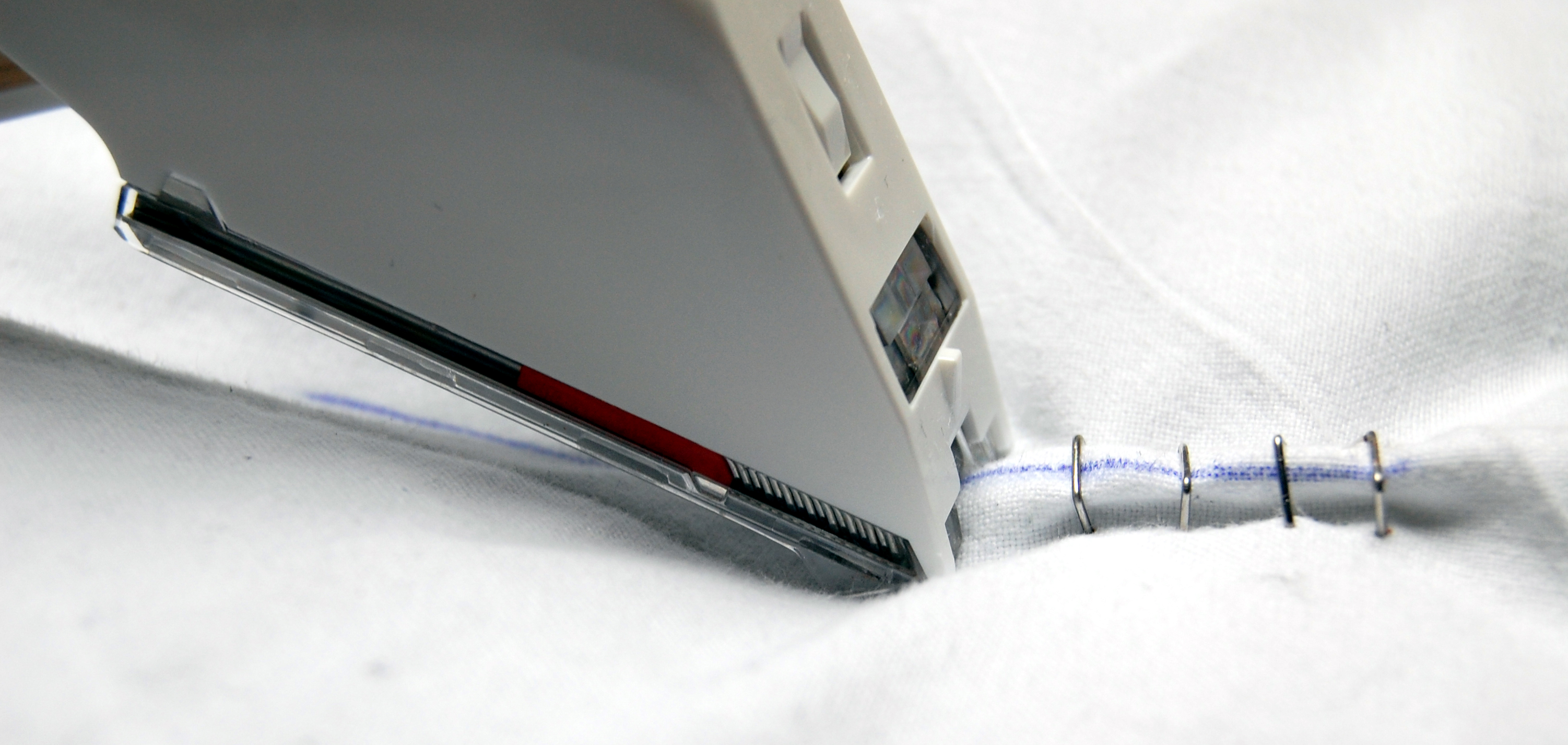
Close-up demonstration of a surgical skin stapler

The first commercial staplers were made of stainless steel with titanium staples loaded into reloadable staple cartridges.

Modern surgical staplers are either disposable and made of plastic, or reusable and made of stainless steel. Both types are generally loaded using disposable cartridges.

Staple lines may be: straight, curved or circular. Circular staplers are used for end-to-end anastomosis after bowel resection or, somewhat more controversially, in esophagogastric surgery. The instruments may be used in either open or laparoscopic surgery, different instruments are used for each application. Laparoscopic staplers are longer, thinner, and may be articulated to allow for access from a restricted number of trocar ports.

Some staplers incorporate a knife to complete excision and anastomosis in a single operation. Staplers are used to close both internal and skin wounds. Skin staples are usually applied using a disposable stapler, and removed with a specialized staple remover. Staplers are also used in vertical banded gastroplasty surgery (popularly known as "stomach stapling").

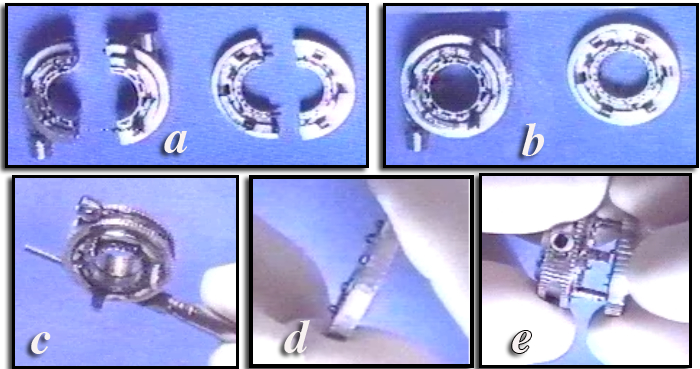
Vascular stapler for reducing warm ischemia in organ transplantation. With this model each stapler end can be mounted on donor and recipient by independent surgical teams without care for reciprocal orientation, being the maximal possible vascular axis torsion ≤30°. Activating guide-wire is connected just immediately before firing (video).

While devices for circular end-to-end anastomosis of digestive tract are widely used, in spite of intensive research circular staplers for vascular anastomosis have not yet had a significant impact on the standard hand (Carrel) suture technique. Vascular staplers are less widely used than digestive staplers. One reason is that small blood vessels require high precision when positioning and activating any device. This level of precision is difficult to achieve, making traditional hand sutures more practical in most cases. An exception to that however could be organ transplantation where these two phases, i.e. device positioning at the vascular stumps and device actioning, can be carried out in different time, by different surgical team, in safe conditions when the time required does not influence donor organ preservation, i.e. at the back table in cold ischemia condition for the donor organ and after native organ removal in the recipient. This is done to minimize the time the donor organ is exposed to warm ischemia, reducing risk during transplantation

Although most surgical staples are made of titanium, stainless steel is more often used in some skin staples and clips. Titanium produces less reaction with the immune system and, being non-ferrous, does not interfere significantly with MRI scanners, although some imaging artifacts may result. Synthetic absorbable (bioabsorbable) staples are also now becoming available, based on polyglycolic acid, as with many synthetic absorbable sutures.

== Removal of skin staples ==
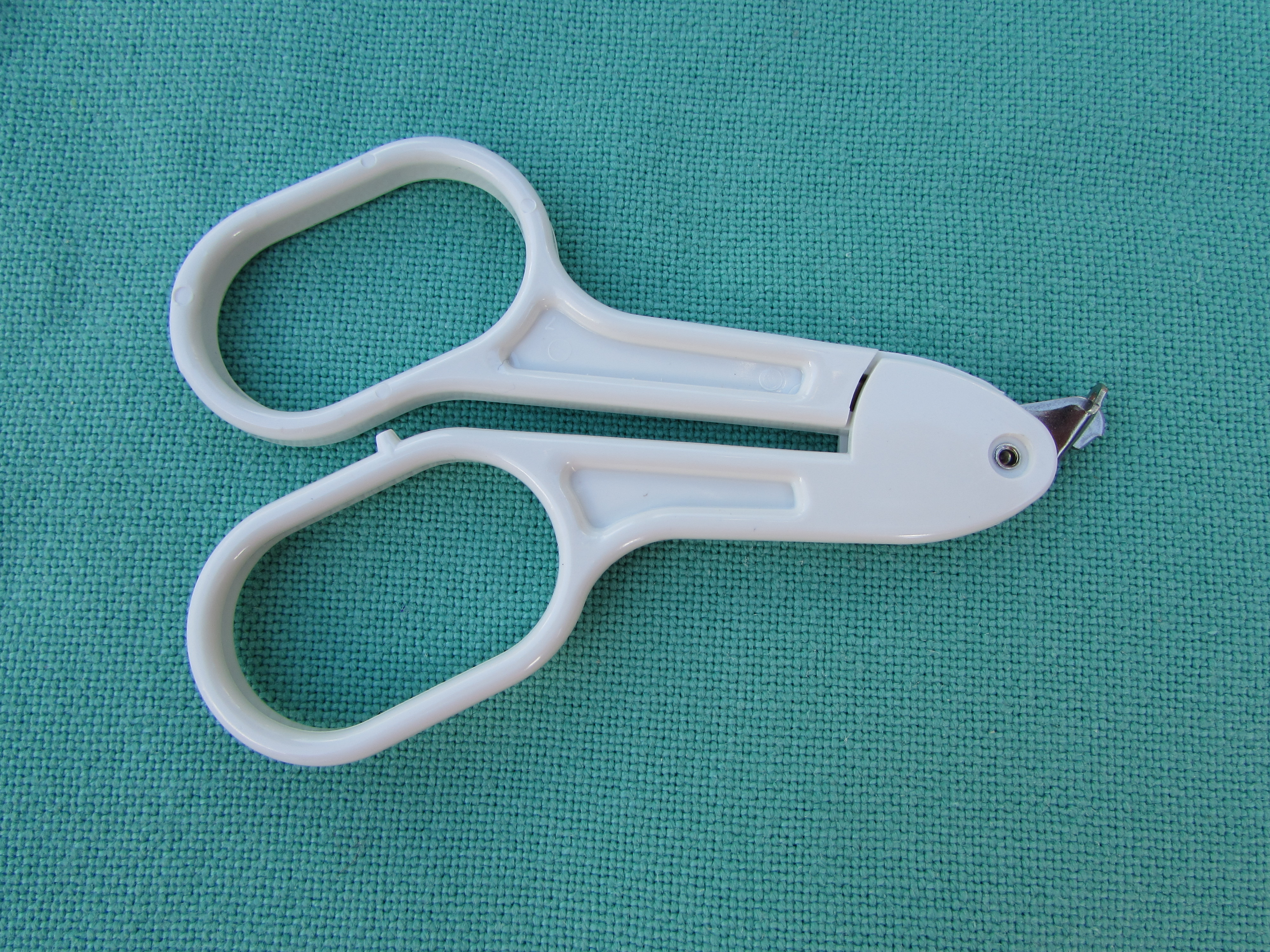
A disposable skin staple remover.

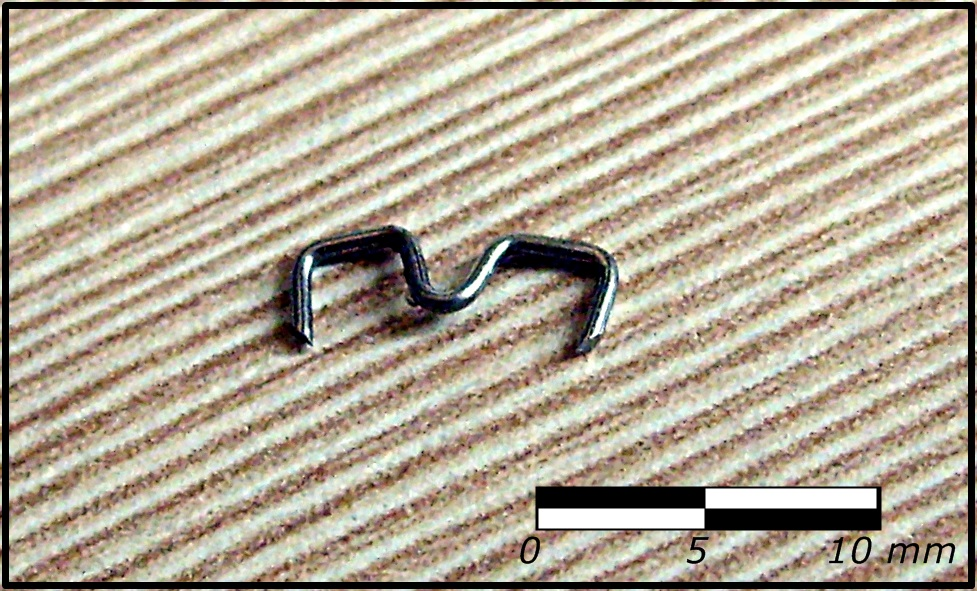
A deformed skin staple after removal.

Where skin staples are used to seal a skin wound it will be necessary to remove the staples after an appropriate healing period, usually between 5 and 10 days, depending on the location of the wound and other factors. The skin staple remover is a small manual device which consists of a shoe or plate that is sufficiently narrow and thin to insert under the skin staple. The active part is a small vertical blade that, when hand-pressure is exerted, pushes the staple down through a slot in the shoe, deforming the staple open into an 'M' shape to facilitate its removal. In an emergency, it is also possible to remove staples with a pair of artery forceps. Skin staple removers are manufactured in many shapes and forms, some disposable and some reusable.

== See also ==
- Instruments used in general surgery
