= Mark M. Ravitch =

American surgeon (1910–1989)

Mark Mitchell Ravitch (September 12, 1910 – March 1, 1989) was an American surgeon. He pioneered the use of surgical staples, the treatment of chest wall deformities, and non-operative management of intussusception.

== Early life and education ==
Ravitch was born in 1910 in New York City. He attended the University of Oklahoma, where he was a member of the Phi Beta Kappa Society and graduated with a degree in zoology in 1930. He received his M.D. from Johns Hopkins University in 1934 and remained at Johns Hopkins to complete his surgical training, which he finished in 1943 under the mentorship of Alfred Blalock.

== Career ==
During the Second World War he served as an army major directing a team of surgeons at the 56th General Hospital in France. He returned to Johns Hopkins at the conclusion of the war, becoming a professor of surgery in 1946. In the late 1940s he developed a new treatment for intussusception, a pediatric condition in which part of the intestine folds into itself. His technique involved the use of a barium enema which could reduce intestinal pressure without the need for surgery. He also pioneered a new surgical procedure for correction of the chest wall deformities pectus excavatum and pectus carinatum, which became known as the Ravitch procedure.

Ravitch moved to New York City in 1952 as a professor of surgery at Columbia College of Physicians and Surgeons and as the director of surgery at Mount Sinai Hospital. He returned to Baltimore after three years to resume his role of professor of surgery at Johns Hopkins and was also appointed surgeon in chief of Baltimore City Hospitals. After visiting the Soviet Union in 1958 and noticing their surgeons' use of fairly crude staplers surgical staples as a time-saving replacement for suturing by hand, Ravitch and Félicien M. Steichen spent several years designing and testing surgical staplers for use in the United States; their design reached the market in 1967 and would eventually become ubiquitous in operating rooms.

Ravitch spent three years at the University of Chicago Medical School from 1966 to 1969 as the head of the pediatric surgery division, before moving to the University of Pittsburgh. In Pittsburgh he served as surgeon in chief at Montefiore Hospital. He continued to teach as a professor of surgery at Pittsburgh until his death in 1989 from colon cancer and prostate cancer.

== Legacy ==
Ravitch served as president of the American Surgical Association in 1983–1984. During the course of his career he published 453 papers, 101 book chapters and 22 books, and was the editor of 20 medical journals. He is regarded as one of the founders of the subspecialty of pediatric surgery, and he and Félicien Steichen are credited with introducing surgical staples to the United States. He was regarded as an authority on the treatment of various deformities of the chest wall. In 1985, Johns Hopkins University established the Mark M. Ravitch, M.D. Endowed Professorship in Surgery.
